Area codes in Germany have two to five digits. In addition, the prefix digit 0 must be dialed when calling from within Germany, and must be omitted when calling from abroad. When calling via fixed networks within the same area, the area code is not required. In general, shorter area codes are assigned to larger cities, and longer area codes to smaller towns. Subscriber telephone numbers are usually inversely long: those in larger cities have seven or eight digits, while those in smaller towns may have as few as three or four digits. Area codes are grouped into eight geographic dialing regions determined by the first digit (2–9). Area codes beginning with 2 are found in the west, those with 3 in the east, those with 4 in the north, those with 5 in the north central part, those with 6 in the south central part, those with 7 in the southwest, those with 8 in the south, and the 9s are found in the southeast.

Prefixes starting with 1 are special numbers, such as mobile telephones (15, 16, 17), shared cost services (180), televoting numbers (13), and 10 for dial-around services. The former codes 130 for free phone numbers and 190 for premium-rate numbers are moved to 800 and 900 to meet international standards. 700 is used for personal national phone numbers.

General prefixes

1
Prefix 1 is used for special numbers, and is not tied to a geographic area.

10
10 call-by-call (dial-around-services – alternative carrier)

11
11 formerly value-added services

12
12 innovative services
12-12 Web.de, Karlsruhe, between €0.13 and €1.86 per minute
12-230 tesion, Stuttgart
12-3000 3U Telecom, Marburg
12-3131 BBA Netkom, Hamburg
12-3333 BBA Netkom, Hamburg
12-3456 CommAssist, Lübeck

13
13 voting and lottery numbers
130 formerly toll-free numbers, now unassigned (now 800)
137 Massenverkehr zu bestimmten Zielen (MABEZ)
1371 €0.14 per call
1372 €0.14 per minute
1373 €0.14 per minute
1374 €0.14 per minute
1375 €0.14 per call
1376 €0.25 per call
1377 €1.00 per call
1378 €0.50 per call
1379 €0.50 per call
138 T-VoteCall €0.14 per minute

14
14 unassigned

15
15 mobile phones
150 reserved for Group 3G/Quam
151 T-Mobile
152 reserved for Vodafone
1520 Vodafone
1521 Lycamobile
1522 Vodafone
1523 Vodafone
155 reserved for E-Plus
156 reserved for Mobilcom
157 reserved for E-Plus
1570 vistream
1573 ALDITalk
1577 E-Plus
1579 sipgate
159 reserved for O2 Germany

16
16 mobile phones, Trunked radio system, Pager
160 T-Mobile
161 formerly analog C-Netz
162 Vodafone
163 E-Plus
164 Cityruf (e*message)
165 formerly Quix
166 Telmi (e*message)
167 Trunked radio systems
1672 Dolphin Telecom
168 Scall (e*message)
169 Cityruf, Scall, Skyper (e*cityruf, e*message, e*skyper)

17
17 mobile phones
170 T-Mobile
171 T-Mobile
172 Vodafone
173 Vodafone
174 Vodafone
175 T-Mobile
176 O2 Germany
177 E-Plus
178 E-Plus
179 O2 Germany

18
18 international virtual private networks (IVPNs) and shared-cost services
180 shared-cost services
1801 €0.039 per minute
1802 €0.06 per connection
1803 €0.09 per minute
1804 €0.20 per connection
1805 €0.14 per minute
181 international virtual private networks (IVPNs)
182 closed user groups
183 closed user groups
184 closed user groups
185 closed user groups
186 closed user groups
187 closed user groups
188 closed user groups
1888 IVBB (Informationsverbund Berlin-Bonn)
189 closed user groups

19
190 formerly premium-rate services, now unassigned (now 900)
191 online services
192 online services
193 online services
194 online services
1987 Routing numbers for (0)116xxx
1988 target network service identification for routing international toll-free value-added services (Freecall)
1989 routing numbers for outgoing services
199 network-internal traffic control

2

20 – Western Ruhrgebiet (Essen and surroundings)

201 Essen
202 Wuppertal
203 Duisburg
204
2041 Bottrop
2043 Gladbeck
2045 Bottrop-Kirchhellen
205
2051 Velbert
2052 Velbert-Langenberg (Rheinland)
2053 Velbert-Neviges
2054 Essen-Kettwig, Mülheim an der Ruhr-Mintard
2056 Heiligenhaus
2058 Wülfrath
206
2064 Dinslaken
2065 Duisburg-Rheinhausen
2066 Duisburg-Homberg (Rheinland)
208 Mülheim an der Ruhr/Oberhausen
209 Gelsenkirchen

21 – Düsseldorf and surroundings
210
2101 formerly Neuss and Kaarst (no longer valid)
2102 Ratingen
2104 Mettmann
211 Düsseldorf
212 Solingen
2129 Haan (Rheinland)
213
2131 Neuss, Kaarst
2132 Meerbusch-Büderich (Düsseldorf)
2133 Dormagen
2137 Neuss-Norf
214 Leverkusen
215
2150 Meerbusch-Lank-Latum
2151 Krefeld
2152 Kempen
2153 Nettetal-Lobberich
2154 Willich
2156 Willich-Anrath
2157 Nettetal-Kaldenkirchen/Brüggen
2158 Grefrath/Nettetal
2159 Meerbusch-Osterath
216
2161 Mönchengladbach
2162 Viersen
2163 Schwalmtal
2164 Jüchen-Otzenrath
2165 Jüchen
2166 Rheydt
217
2171 Leverkusen-Opladen
2173 Langenfeld (Rheinland), Leverkusen-Hitdorf
2174 Burscheid (Rheinland), Leichlingen-Witzhelden
2175 Leichlingen
218
2181 Grevenbroich
2182 Grevenbroich-Kapellen
2183 Rommerskirchen
219
2191 Remscheid
2192 Hückeswagen
2193 Wermelskirchen-Dabringhausen
2195 Radevormwald
2196 Wermelskirchen

22 – Cologne and surroundings
220
2202 Bergisch Gladbach
2203 Köln-Porz
2204 Bergisch Gladbach-Bensberg, OT Untereschbach von Overath
2205 Rösrath
2206 Overath; parts of Lohmar
2207 Dürscheid; parts of Overath
2208 Niederkassel
221 Köln (Cologne)
222
2222 Bornheim, Roisdorf
2223 Königswinter
2224 Bad Honnef
2225 Meckenheim (Rheinland); parts of Wachtberg
2226 Rheinbach
2227 Merten, Walberberg, Sechtem
2228 Rolandseck
223
2232 Brühl (Rheinland); Berzdorf von Wesseling, Köln-Meschenich
2233 Hürth (Rheinland); Köln-Rondorf
2234 Frechen; Lövenich, Köln-Marsdorf and Köln-Weiden
2235 Erftstadt
2236 Wesseling (Rheinland); Köln-Godorf, Köln-Hahnwald, Köln-Immendorf, Köln-Rodenkirchen, Köln-Sürth and Köln-Weiß
2237 Kerpen (Rheinland)
2238 Pulheim
224
2241 Siegburg/Sankt Augustin/Troisdorf
2242 Hennef (Sieg)
2243 Eitorf
2244 Oberpleis
2245 Much
2246 Lohmar
2247 Neunkirchen-Seelscheid
2248 Uckerath
225
2251 Euskirchen
2252 Zülpich
2253 Bad Münstereifel
2254 Weilerswist
2255 Euskirchen-Flamersheim
2256 Mechernich-Satzvey
2257 Reckerscheid
226
2261 Gummersbach
2262 Wiehl
2263 Engelskirchen
2264 Marienheide
2265 Eckenhagen
2266 Lindlar
2267 Wipperfürth
2268 Kürten
2269 Rönsahl
227
2271 Bergheim
2272 Bedburg
2273 Kerpen-Horrem
2274 Elsdorf (Rheinland)
2275 Kerpen-Buir
228 Bonn; Niederkassel-Mondorf
229
2291 Waldbröl
2292 Windeck (Sieg)
2293 Nümbrecht
2294 Morsbach (Sieg)
2295 Ruppichteroth
2296 Brüchermühle
2297 Wildbergerhütte

23 – Dortmund and surroundings
230
2301 Holzwickede
2302 Witten
2303 Unna
2304 Schwerte
2305 Castrop-Rauxel
2306 Lünen
2307 Kamen/Bergkamen
2308 Unna-Hemmerde
2309 Waltrop
231 Dortmund/Lünen-Brambauer
232
2323 Herne
2324 Hattingen
2325 Herne-Wanne-Eickel
2327 Bochum-Wattenscheid
233
2330 Herdecke
2331 Hagen
2332 Gevelsberg
2333 Ennepetal
2334 Hagen-Hohenlimburg
2335 Wetter
2336 Schwelm
2337 Hagen-Dahl
2338 Breckerfeld
2339 Sprockhövel
234 Bochum
235
2350 (no longer valid; now 02352)
2351 Lüdenscheid
2352 Altena
2353 Halver
2354 Meinerzhagen
2355 Schalksmühle
2357 Herscheid
2358 Valbert
2359 Kierspe
236
2360 Lippramsdorf
2361 Recklinghausen
2362 Dorsten
2363 Datteln
2364 Haltern
2365 Marl
2366 Herten/Rhade
2367 Castrop-Rauxel-Henrichenburg
2368 Oer-Erkenschwick
2369 Dorsten-Wulfen/Dorsten-Lembeck
237
2371 Iserlohn
2372 Hemer
2373 Menden/Fröndenberg
2374 Iserlohn-Letmathe
2375 Balve
2377 Wickede
2378 Fröndenberg-Langschede
2379 Menden-Asbeck
238
2381 Hamm
2382 Ahlen (Westf.)
2383 Bönen
2384 Welver
2385 Hamm-Rhynern
2387 Walstedde
2388 Hamm-Uentrop
2389 Werne
239
2391 Plettenberg
2392 Werdohl/Neuenrade
2393 Allendorf
2394 Neuenrade-Affeln
2395 Rönkhausen

24 – Aachen and surroundings
240
2401 Baesweiler
2402 Stolberg (Rheinland)
2403 Eschweiler
2404 Alsdorf
2405 Würselen
2406 Herzogenrath
2407 Herzogenrath-Kohlscheid
2408 Aachen-Kornelimünster
2409 Gressenich
241 Aachen
242
2421 Düren
2422 Kreuzau
2423 Langerwehe
2424 Vettweiß
2425 Embken
2426 Nörvenich
2427 Nideggen
2428 Niederzier
2429 Hürtgenwald
243
2431 Erkelenz
2432 Wassenberg
2433 Hückelhoven
2434 Wegberg
2435 Lövenich
2436 Roedgen
244
2440 Nettersheim-Tondorf
2441 Kall
2443 Mechernich
2444 Gemünd
2445 Schleiden
2446 Heimbach (Eifel)
2447 Dahlem
2448 Rescheid
2449 Blankenheim
245
2451 Geilenkirchen/Übach-Palenberg
2452 Heinsberg
2453 Randerath
2454 Gangelt
2455 Waldfeucht
2456 Selfkant
246
2461 Jülich
2462 Linnich
2463 Titz
2464 Aldenhoven
2465 Inden
247
2471 Roetgen
2472 Monschau
2473 Simmerath
2474 Schmidt (Nideggen)
248
2482 Hellenthal
2484 Eiserfey
2485 Dreiborn
2486 Nettersheim
249

25 – Münster and surroundings
250
2501 Münster-Hiltrup, Münster-Amelsbüren
2502 Nottuln
2504 Telgte
2505 Altenberge (Westf.)
2506 Münster-Wolbeck
2507 Havixbeck
2508 Drensteinfurt
2509 Nottuln-Appelhülsen
251 Münster
252
2520 Wadersloh-Diestedde
2521 Beckum
2522 Oelde
2523 Wadersloh
2524 Ennigerloh
2525 Neubeckum
2526 Sendenhorst
2527 Lippetal
2528 Enniger
2529 Stromberg, Oelde
253
2532 Ostbevern
2533 Münster-Nienberge
2534 Münster-Roxel
2535 Albersloh
2536 Münster-Albachten
2538 Drensteinfurt-Rinkerode
254
2541 Coesfeld
2542 Gescher
2543 Billerbeck
2545 Rosendahl
2546 Lette, Coesfeld
2547 Osterwick
2548 Rorup
255
2551 Steinfurt-Burgsteinfurt
2552 Steinfurt-Borghorst
2553 Ochtrup
2554 Laer (ST)
2555 Schöppingen
2556 Metelen
2557 Wettringen (ST)
2558 Horstmar
256
2561 Ahaus
2562 Gronau (Westf.)
2563 Stadtlohn
2564 Vreden
2565 Epe
2566 Legden
2567 Ahaus-Alstätte
2568 Heek
257
2571 Greven
2572 Emsdetten
2573 Nordwalde
2574 Saerbeck
2575 Reckenfeld
258
2581 Warendorf
2582 Everswinkel
2583 Sassenberg
2584 Milte
2585 Hoetmar
2586 Beelen
2587 Westkirchen (Westf)
2588 Greffen
259
2590 Dülmen-Buldern
2591 Lüdinghausen
2592 Selm
2593 Ascheberg
2594 Dülmen
2595 Olfen
2596 Nordkirchen
2597 Senden
2598 Ottmarsbocholt
2599 Herbern

26 – Koblenz and surroundings
260
2601 Nauort
2602 Montabaur
2603 Bad Ems
2604 Nassau (Lahn)
2605 Löf
2606 Winningen
2607 Kobern-Gondorf
2608 Welschneudorf
261 Koblenz
262
2620 Neuhäusel (WW)
2621 Lahnstein
2622 Bendorf
2623 Ransbach-Baumbach
2624 Höhr-Grenzhausen
2625 Ochtendung
2626 Selters (Westerwald)
2627 Braubach
2628 Rhens
263
2630 Mülheim-Kärlich
2631 Neuwied
2632 Andernach
2633 Brohl-Lützing
2634 Rengsdorf
2635 Rheinbrohl
2636 Burgbrohl
2637 Weissenthurm
2638 Waldbreitbach
2639 Anhausen (Neuwied)
264
2641 Bad Neuenahr-Ahrweiler
2642 Remagen
2643 Altenahr
2644 Linz am Rhein
2645 Vettelschoss
2646 Königsfeld (Eifel)
2647 Kesseling
265
2651 Mayen
2652 Mendig
2653 Kaisersesch
2654 Polch
2655 Weibern
2656 Virneburg
2657 Uersfeld
266
2661 Bad Marienberg (WW)
2662 Hachenburg
2663 Westerburg
2664 Rennerod
2666 Freilingen (WW)
2667 Stein-Neukirch
267
2671 Cochem
2672 Treis-Karden
2673 Ellenz-Poltersdorf
2674 Bad Bertrich
2675 Ediger-Eller
2676 Ulmen
2677 Lutzerath
2678 Büchel (COC)
268
2680 Mündersbach
2681 Altenkirchen (Westerwald)
2682 Hamm (Sieg)
2683 Asbach (Westerwald)
2684 Puderbach (WW)
2685 Flammersfeld
2686 Weyerbusch
2687 Horhausen (Westerwald)
2688 Kroppach
2689 Dierdorf
269
2691 Adenau
2692 Kelberg
2693 Antweiler
2694 Wershofen
2695 Insul
2696 Nohn (Eifel)
2697 Ahrhütte (Blankenheim)

27 – Siegen and surroundings
271 Siegen
272
2721 Lennestadt
2722 Attendorn
2723 Kirchhundem
2724 Serkenrode
2725 Oedingen
273
2732 Kreuztal
2733 Hilchenbach
2734 Freudenberg
2735 Neunkirchen
2736 Burbach
2737 Netphen-Deuz
2738 Netphen
2739 Wilnsdorf
274
2741 Betzdorf
2742 Wissen
2743 Daaden
2744 Herdorf
2745 Brachbach
2747 Molzhain
275
2750 Diedenshausen
2751 Bad Berleburg
2752 Bad Laasphe
2753 Erndtebrück
2754 Feudingen
2755 Schwarzenau
2758 Girkhausen
2759 Aue (Bad Berleburg)
276
2761 Olpe
2762 Wenden
2763 Bleche
2764 Welschen Ennest
277
2770 Eschenburg
2771 Dillenburg
2772 Herborn
2773 Haiger
2774 Dietzhölztal
2775 Driedorf
2776 Bad Endbach-Hartenrod
2777 Breitscheid (Hesse)
2778 Siegbach
2779 Greifenstein-Beilstein

28 – Wesel and surroundings
280
2801 Xanten
2802 Alpen
2803 Büderich (Wesel)
2804 Marienbaum
281 Wesel
282
2821 Kleve
2822 Emmerich am Rhein
2823 Goch
2824 Kalkar
2825 Uedem
2826 Kranenburg
2827 Goch-Hassum
2828 Elten (zu Emmerich am Rhein)
283
2831 Geldern
2832 Kevelaer
2833 Kerken
2834 Straelen
2835 Issum
2836 Wachtendonk
2837 Weeze
2838 Sonsbeck
2839 Straelen-Herongen
284
2841 Moers
2842 Kamp-Lintfort
2843 Rheinberg
2844 Orsoy
2845 Neukirchen-Vluyn
285
2850 Haldern
2851 Rees
2852 Hamminkeln
2853 Schermbeck
2855 Voerde (Rheinland)
2856 Brünen
2857 Rees-Mehr
2858 Hünxe
2859 Bislich
286
2861 Borken
2862 Südlohn
2863 Velen
2864 Reken
2865 Raesfeld
2866 Dorsten
2867 Heiden (BOR)
287
2871 Bocholt
2872 Rhede (Westf)
2873 Werth
2874 Isselburg/Bocholt – Suderwick

29 – Sauerland (Meschede and surroundings)
290
2902 Warstein
2903 Freienohl
2904 Bestwig
2905 Ramsbeck
291 Meschede
292
2921 Soest
2922 Werl
2923 Herzfeld (Lippetal)
2924 Möhnesee
2925 Allagen
2927 Bad Sassendorf
2928 Ostönnen
293
2931 Arnsberg
2932 Neheim-Hüsten
2933 Sundern
2934 Sundern-Altenhellefeld
2935 Sundern-Hachen
2937 Arnsberg-Oeventrop
2938 Ense
294
2941 Lippstadt
2942 Geseke
2943 Erwitte
2944 Rietberg-Mastholte
2945 Lippstadt-Benninghausen
2947 Anröchte
2948 Lippstadt-Rebbeke
295
2951 Büren
2952 Rüthen
2953 Bad Wünnenberg
2954 Rüthen-Oestereiden
2955 Wewelsburg
2957 Bad Wünnenberg-Haaren
2958 Büren-Harth
296
2961 Brilon
2962 Olsberg
2963 Messinghausen
2964 Alme (Brilon)
297
2970 disused
2971 Schmallenberg-Dorlar
2972 Schmallenberg
2973 Eslohe (Sauerland)
2974 Schmallenberg-Bad Fredeburg
2975 Schmallenberg-Oberkirchen
2977 Schmallenberg-Bödefeld
2978 disused
2979 disused
298
2981 Winterberg (Sauerld.)
2982 Medebach
2983 Winterberg-Siedlinghausen
2984 Hallenberg
2985 Winterberg-Niedersfeld
299
2991 Marsberg-Bredelar
2992 Marsberg
2993 Marsberg-Canstein
2994 Marsberg-Westheim

3
All of former East Germany and Berlin

East Germany was using +37 before the reunification. After reunification, East Germany was merged into the existing (West) German numbering plan. Since all areas except 03 were already used, all of former East Germany needed to be merged into 03, causing numbers and area codes in the 03 area to be longer than those in the rest of Germany: Many area codes in the 03 area are 5-digit while the maximum in the rest of Germany is 4 digits

30 – Berlin
30 Berlin

31 – Test numbers for carrier selection
310 test number (long distance)
311 test number (local)

32 – Non-geographic numbers
32 non-geographic national subscriber numbers for VoIP, etc. (Nationale Teilnehmerrufnummern (NTR) [in German])

33 – Brandenburg

330 – Oranienburg and surroundings
3301 Oranienburg
3302 Hennigsdorf
3303 Birkenwerder
3304 Velten
3305
33051 Nassenheide
33053 Zehlendorf
33054 Liebenwalde
33055 Kremmen
33056 Mühlenbeck
3306 Gransee
3307 Zehdenick
3308
33080 Marienthal
33082 Menz
33083 Schulzendorf
33084 Gutengermendorf
33085 Seilershof
33086 Grieben
33087 Bredereiche
33088 Falkenthal
33089 Himmelpfort
3309
33093 Fürstenberg/Havel
33094 Löwenberger Land

331/0332 – Potsdam and surroundings
331 Potsdam
332
3320
33200 Bergholz-Rehbrücke
33201 Groß Glienicke
33202 Töplitz
33203 Kleinmachnow
33204 Beelitz
33205 Michendorf
33206 Fichtenwalde
33207 Groß Kreutz
33208 Fahrland
33209 Caputh
3321 Nauen
3322 Falkensee
3323
33230 Börnicke
33231 Pausin
33232 Brieselang
33233 Ketzin
33234 Wustermark
33235 Friesack
33237 Paulinenaue
33238 Senzke
33239 Groß Behnitz
3327 Werder (Havel)
3328 Teltow
3329 Stahnsdorf

333 – Angermünde and surroundings
3331 Angermünde
3332 Schwedt
3333
33331 Casekow
33332 Gartz (Oder)
33333 Tantow
33334 Greiffenberg
33335 Pinnow
33336 Passow
33337 Altkünkendorf
33338 Stolpe/Oder
3334 Eberswalde
3335 Finowfurt
3336
33361 Joachimsthal
33362 Liepe
33363 Altenhof
33364 Groß Ziethen
33365 Lüdersdorf
33366 Chorin
33367 Friedrichswalde
33368 Hohensaaten
33369 Oderberg
3337 Biesenthal
3338 Bernau
3339
33393 Groß Schönebeck
33394 Blumberg
33395 Zerpenschleuse
33396 Klosterfelde
33397 Wandlitz
33398 Werneuchen

334 – Strausberg and surroundings
3341 Strausberg
3342 Neuenhagen
3343
33432 Müncheberg
33433 Buckow
33434 Herzfelde bei Strausberg
33435 Rehfelde
33436 Prötzel
33437 Reichenberg bei Strausberg
33438 Altlandsberg
33439 Fredersdorf-Vogelsdorf
3344 Bad Freienwalde
3345
33451 Heckelberg
33452 Neulewin
33454 Wölsickendorf/Wollenber
33456 Wriezen
33457 Altreetz
33458 Falkenberg (Mark)
3346 Seelow
3347 --
33470 Lietzen
33472 Golzow bei Seelow
33473 Zechin
33474 Neutrebbin
33475 Letschin
33476 Neuhardenberg
33477 Trebnitz bei Müncheberg
33478 Groß Neuendorf
33479 Küstrin-Kietz

335/0336 – Frankfurt (Oder) and surroundings
335 Frankfurt (Oder)
336
3360
33601 Podelzig
33602 Alt Zeschdorf
33603 Falkenhagen (Mark)
33604 Lebus
33605 Boossen
33606 Müllrose
33607 Briesen (Mark)
33608 Jacobsdorf
33609 Brieskow-Finkenheerd
3361 Fürstenwalde/Spree
3362 Erkner
3363
33631 Bad Saarow
33632 Hangelsberg
33633 Spreenhagen
33634 Berkenbrück
33635 Arensdorf
33636 Steinhöfel
33637 Beerfelde
33638 Rüdersdorf bei Berlin
3364 Eisenhüttenstadt
3365
33652 Neuzelle
33653 Ziltendorf
33654 Fünfeichen
33655 Grunow
33656 Bahro
33657 Steinsdorf
3366 Beeskow
3367
33671 Lieberose
33672 Pfaffendorf bei Beeskow
33673 Weichensdorf
33674 Trebatsch
33675 Tauche
33676 Friedland (Niederlausitz)
33677 Glienicke bei Beeskow
33678 Storkow (Mark)
33679 Wendisch Rietz

337 – Luckenwalde and surroundings
3370
33701 Großbeeren
33702 Wünsdorf
33703 Am Mellensee
33704 Baruth/Mark
33708 Rangsdorf
3371 Luckenwalde
3372 Jüterbog
3373
33731 Trebbin
33732 Hennickendorf
33733 Stülpe
33734 Felgentreu
3374
33741 Niedergörsdorf
33742 Oehna
33743 Blönsdorf
33744 Hohenseefeld
33745 Petkus
33746 Werbig bei Jüterbog
33747 Marzahna
33748 Treuenbrietzen
3375 Königs Wusterhausen
3376
33760 Münchehofe
33762 Zeuthen
33763 Bestensee
33764 Mittenwalde (Mark)
33765 Märkisch Buchholz
33766 Teupitz
33767 Friedersdorf bei Berlin
33768 Prieros
33769 Töpchin
3377 Zossen
3378 Ludwigsfelde
3379 Mahlow

338 – Brandenburg an der Havel and surroundings
3381 Brandenburg an der Havel
3382 Lehnin
3383
33830 Ziesar
33831 Weseram
33832 Rogäsen
33833 Wollin
33834 Pritzerbe
33835 Golzow
33836 Butzow
33837 Brielow
33838 Päwesin
33839 Wusterwitz
3384
33841 Belzig
33843 Niemegk
33844 Brück
33845 Borkheide
33846 Dippmannsdorf
33847 Görzke
33848 Raben
33849 Wiesenburg/Mark
3385 Rathenow
3386 Premnitz
3387
33870 Zollchow bei Rathenow
33872 Hohennauen
33873 Großwudicke
33874 Stechow
33875 Rhinow
33876 Buschow
33877 Nitzahn
33878 Nennhausen

339 – Neuruppin and surroundings
3391 Neuruppin
3392
33920 Walsleben bei Neuruppin
33921 Zechlinerhütte
33922 Karwesee
33923 Flecken Zechlin
33924 Rägelin
33925 Wustrau-Altfriesack
33926 Herzberg (Mark)
33928 Wildberg
33929 Gühlen-Glienicke
3393
33931 Rheinsberg
33932 Fehrbellin
33933 Lindow (Mark)
3394 Wittstock/Dosse
3395 Pritzwalk
3396
33962 Heiligengrabe
33963 Wulfersdorf bei Wittstock
33964 Fretzdorf
33965 Herzsprung bei Wittstock
33966 Dranse
33967 Freyenstein
33968 Meyenburg
33969 Stepenitz
3397
33970 Neustadt (Dosse)
33971 Kyritz
33972 Breddin
33973 Zernitz bei Neustadt
33974 Dessow
33975 Dannenwalde
33976 Wutike
33977 Gumtow
33978 Segeletz
33979 Wusterhausen/Dosse
3398
33981 Putlitz
33982 Hoppenrade
33983 Groß Pankow
33984 Blumenthal bei Pritzwalk
33986 Falkenhagen
33989 Sadenbeck

34 – Leipzig and surroundings
340 Dessau
341 Leipzig
342
3420
34202 Delitzsch
34203 Zwenkau
34204 Schkeuditz
34205 Markranstädt
34206 Rötha
34207 Zwochau
34208 Löbnitz
3421 Torgau
3422
34221 Schildau
34222 Arzberg
34223 Dommitzsch
34224 Belgern
3423 Eilenburg
3424
34241 Jesewitz
34242 Hohenprießnitz
34243 Bad Düben
34244 Mockrehna
3425 Wurzen
3426
34261 Kühren bei Wurzen
34262 Falkenhain
34263 Großzschepa
3429
34291 Borsdorf
34292 Brandis
34293 Naunhof
34294 Rackwitz
34295 Krensitz
34296 Groitzsch
34297 Liebertwolkwitz
34298 Taucha
34299 Gaschwitz
343
3431 Döbeln
3432
34321 Leisnig
34322 Roßwein
34324 Ostrau, Landkreis Mittelsachsen
34325 Lüttewitz Ortsteil von Zschaitz-Ottewig
34327 Waldheim
34328 Hartha
3433 Borna
3434
34341 Geithain
34342 Neukieritzsch
34343 Regis-Breitingen
34344 Kohren-Sahlis
34345 Bad Lausick
34346 Narsdorf
34347 Oelzschau
34348 Frohburg
3435 Oschatz
3436
34361 Dahlen (Sachsen)
34362 Mügeln
34363 Cavertitz
34364 Wermsdorf
3437 Grimma
3438
34381 Colditz
34382 Nerchau
34383 Trebsen
34384 Großbothen
34385 Mutzschen
34386 Dürrweitzschen
344
3441 Zeitz
3443 Weißenfels
3445 Naumburg
34463 Prießnitz
3447 Altenburg
3448 Meuselwitz
3449
34491 Schmölln
34492 Lucka
34493 Gößnitz
34494 Ehrenhain
34495 Dobitschen
34496 Nöbdenitz
34497 Langenleuba-Niederhain
34498 Rositz
345 Halle (Saale)
346
3460
34600 Ostrau (Petersberg)
34601 Teutschenthal
34602 Landsberg
34603 Nauendorf
34604 Niemberg
34605 Kabelsketal-Gröbers
34606 Teicha
34607 Wettin
34609 Salzmünde
3461 Merseburg
3462 Bad Dürrenberg
3463
34632 Mücheln (Geiseltal)
34633 Braunsbedra
34635 Bad Lauchstädt
34636 Schafstädt
34637 Frankleben
34638 Zöschen
34639 Wallendorf (Luppe)
3464 Sangerhausen
3465
34651 Rossla
34652 Allstedt
34653 Rottleberode
34654 Stolberg (Harz)
34656 Wallhausen, Saxony-Anhalt
34658 Hayn
34659 Blankenheim bei Sangerhausen
3466 Artern
3467
34671 Bad Frankenhausen/Kyffhäuser
34672 Roßleben
34673 Heldrungen
3469
34691 Könnern
34692 Alsleben (Saale)
347
3471 Bernburg
3472
34721 Nienburg
34722 Preußlitz
3473 Aschersleben
3474
34741 Frose
34742 Sylda
34743 Ermsleben
34745 Winningen
34746 Giersleben
3475 Lutherstadt Eisleben
3476 Hettstedt
3477
34771 Querfurt
34772 Helbra
34773 Schwittersdorf
34774 Röblingen am See
34775 Wippra
34776 Rothenschirmbach
34779 Abberode
3478
34781 Greifenhagen
34782 Mansfeld-Südharz
34783 Gerbstedt
34785 Sandersleben
349
3490
34901 Rosslau
34903 Coswig (Anhalt)
34904 Oranienbaum
34905 Wörlitz
34906 Raguhn
34907 Jeber-Bergfrieden
34909 Aken
3491 Lutherstadt Wittenberg
3492
34920 Kropstädt
34921 Kemberg
34922 Mühlanger
34923 Cobbelsdorf
34924 Zahna
34925 Bad Schmiedeberg
34926 Pretzsch (Elbe)
34927 Globig
34928 Seegrehna
34929 Straach
3493 Bitterfeld
3494 Wolfen
3495
34953 Gräfenhainichen
34954 Roitzsch
34955 Gossa
34956 Zörbig
3496 Köthen (Anhalt)
3497
34973 Osternienburg
34975 Görzig
34976 Gröbzig
34977 Quellendorf
34978 Radegast
34979 Wulfen

35 – Dresden

350 – Pirna and surroundings
3501 Pirna
3502
35020 Struppen
35021 Königstein
35022 Bad Schandau
35023 Bad Gottleuba
35024 Stadt Wehlen
35025 Liebstadt
35026 Dürrröhrsdorf
35027 Weesenstein
35028 Krippen
3503
35032 Langenhennersdorf
35033 Rosenthal
3504 Dippoldiswalde
3505
35052 Kipsdorf
35053 Glashütte
35054 Lauenstein
35055 Höckendorf
35056 Altenberg
35057 Hermsdorf
35058 Pretzschendorf

351 – Dresden
351 Dresden

352 – Meißen and surroundings
3520
35200 Arnsdorf
35201 Langebrück
35202 Klingenberg
35203 Tharandt
35204 Wilsdruff
35205 Ottendorf-Okrilla
35206 Kreischa
35207 Moritzburg
35208 Radeburg
35209 Mohorn
3521 Meißen
3522 Großenhain
3523 Coswig
3524
35240 Tauscha
35241 Lommatzsch
35242 Nossen
35243 Weinböhla
35244 Krögis
35245 Burkhardswalde
35246 Ziegenhain
35247 Zehren
35248 Schönfeld
35249 Basslitz
3525 Riesa
3526
35263 Gröditz
35264 Strehla
35265 Glaubitz
35266 Heyda
35267 Diesbar-Seußlitz
35268 Stauchitz
3528 Radeberg
3529 Heidenau

353 – Finsterwalde and surroundings
3531 Finsterwalde
3532
35322 Doberlug-Kirchhain
35323 Sonnewalde
35324 Crinitz
35325 Rückersdorf
35326 Schönborn
35327 Prießen
35329 Dollenchen
3533 Elsterwerda
3534
35341 Bad Liebenwerda
35342 Mühlberg (Elbe)
35343 Hirschfeld
3535 Herzberg (Elster)
3536
35361 Schlieben
35362 Schönewalde
35363 Fermerswalde
35364 Lebusa
35365 Falkenberg (Elster)
3537 Jessen (Elster)
3538
35383 Elster (Elbe)
35384 Steinsdorf
35385 Annaburg
35386 Prettin
35387 Seyda
35388 Klöden
35389 Holzdorf

354 – Calau and surroundings
3541 Calau
3542 Lübbenau
3543
35433 Vetschau/Spreewald
35434 Altdöbern
35435 Gollmitz
35436 Laasow
35439 Zinnitz
3544 Luckau
3545
35451 Dahme
35452 Golßen
35453 Drahnsdorf
35454 Uckro
35455 Walddrehna
35456 Terpt
3546 Lübben (Spreewald)
3547
35471 Birkenhainchen
35472 Schlepzig
35473 Neu Lübbenau
35474 Schönwald (Brandenburg)
35475 Straupitz
35476 Wittmannsdorf
35477 Rietz Neuendorf
35478 Goyatz

355/0356 – Cottbus and surroundings
355 Cottbus
3560
35600 Döbern
35601 Peitz
35602 Drebkau
35603 Burg (Spreewald)
35604 Krieschow
35605 Komptendorf
35606 Briesen
35607 Jänschwalde
35608 Groß Oßnig
35609 Drachhausen
3561 Guben
3562 Forst (Lausitz)
3563 Spremberg
3564 Schwarze Pumpe
3569
35691 Bärenklau
35692 Kerkwitz
35693 Lauschütz
35694 Gosda
35695 Simmersdorf
35696 Briesnig
35697 Bagenz
35698 Hornow

357 – Hoyerswerda and surroundings
3571 Hoyerswerda
3572
35722 Lauta
35723 Bernsdorf
35724 Lohsa
35725 Wittichenau
35726 Groß Särchen
35727 Burghammer
35728 Uhyst
3573 Senftenberg
3574 Lauchhammer
3575
35751 Welzow
35752 Ruhland
35753 Großräschen
35754 Klettwitz
35755 Ortrand
35756 Hosena
3576 Weißwasser
3577
35771 Bad Muskau
35772 Rietschen
35773 Schleife (Sachsen)
35774 Boxberg (Oberlausitz)
35775 Pechern
3578 Kamenz
3579
35792 Oßling
35793 Elstra
35795 Königsbrück
35796 Panschwitz-Kuckau
35797 Schwepnitz

358 – Görlitz and surroundings
3581 Görlitz
3582
35820 Zodel
35822 Hagenwerder
35823 Ostritz
35825 Kodersdorf
35826 Königshain
35827 Nieder Seifersdorf
35828 Reichenbach (Oberlausitz)
35829 Gersdorf, Saxony
3583 Zittau
3584
35841 Großschönau
35842 Niederoderwitz
35843 Hirschfelde
35844 Oybin
3585 Löbau
3586 Ebersbach/Sa., Neugersdorf
3587
35872 Neusalza-Spremberg
35873 Herrnhut
35874 Bernstadt a. d. Eigen
35875 Obercunnersdorf
35876 Weißenberg
35877 Cunewalde
3588 Niesky
3589
35891 Rothenburg (Oberlausitz)
35892 Horka
35893 Mücka
35894 Hähnichen
35895 Klitten

359 – Bautzen and surroundings
3591 Bautzen
3592 Kirschau
3593
35930 Seitschen
35931 Königswartha
35932 Guttau
35933 Neschwitz
35934 Großdubrau
35935 Kleinwelka
35936 Sohland an der Spree
35937 Prischwitz
35938 Großpostwitz
35939 Hochkirch
3594 Bischofswerda
3595
35951 Neukirch/Lausitz
35952 Großröhrsdorf
35953 Burkau
35954 Grossharthau
35955 Pulsnitz
3596 Neustadt in Sachsen
3597
35971 Sebnitz
35973 Stolpen
35974 Hinterhermsdorf
35975 Hohnstein

36 – Thüringen

360 – Mühlhausen/Thür. and surroundings
3601 Mühlhausen/Thür.
3602
36020 Ebeleben
36021 Schlotheim
36022 Großengottern
36023 Horsmar
36024 Diedorf
36025 Körner
36026 Rodeberg (Struth)
36027 Lengenfeld unterm Stein
36028 Kammerforst
36029 Menteroda
3603 Bad Langensalza
3604
36041 Bad Tennstedt
36042 Gräfentonna
36043 Kirchheilingen
3605 Leinefelde
3606 Heilbad Heiligenstadt
3607
36071 Teistungen
36072 Weißenborn-Lüderode
36074 Worbis
36075 Dingelstädt
36076 Niederorschel
36077 Großbodungen
3608
36081 Arenshausen
36082 Ershausen
36083 Uder
36084 Heuthen
36085 Reinholterode
36087 Wüstheuterode

361 – Erfurt
361 Erfurt

362 – Gotha and surroundings
3620
36200 Elxleben
36201 Walschleben
36202 Neudietendorf
36203 Vieselbach
36204 Stotternheim
36205 Gräfenroda
36206 Großfahner
36207 Plaue
36208 Ermstedt
36209 Klettbach
3621 Gotha
3622 Waltershausen
3623 Friedrichroda
3624 Ohrdruf
3625
36252 Tambach-Dietharz/Thür. Wald
36253 Georgenthal (Thüringen)
36254 Friedrichswerth
36255 Goldbach
36256 Wechmar
36257 Luisenthal
36258 Friemar
36259 Bad Tabarz
3628 Arnstadt
3629 Stadtilm

363 – Nordhausen and surroundings
3631 Nordhausen
3632 Sondershausen
3633
36330 Großberndten
36331 Ilfeld
36332 Ellrich
36333 Heringen/Helme
36334 Wolkramshausen
36335 Großwechsungen
36336 Klettenberg
36337 Schiedungen
36338 Bleicherode
3634 Sömmerda
3635 Kölleda
3636 Greußen
3637
36370 Großenehrich
36371 Schloßvippach
36372 Kleinneuhausen
36373 Buttstädt
36374 Weißensee
36375 Kindelbrück
36376 Straußfurt
36377 Rastenberg
36378 Ostramondra
36379 Holzengel

364 – Jena/Weimar and surroundings
3641 Jena
3642
36421 Camburg
36422 Reinstädt
36423 Orlamünde
36424 Kahla
36425 Isserstedt
36426 Ottendorf
36427 Dornburg (Saale)
36428 Stadtroda
3643 Weimar
3644 Apolda
3645
36450 Kranichfeld
36451 Buttelstedt
36452 Berlstedt
36453 Mellingen
36454 Magdala
36458 Bad Berka
36459 Blankenhain
3646
36461 Bad Sulza
36462 Oßmannstedt
36463 Gebstedt
36464 Wormstedt
36465 Oberndorf
3647 Pößneck
3648
36481 Neustadt (Orla)
36482 Triptis
36483 Ziegenrück
36484 Knau

365/0366 – Gera and surroundings
365 Gera
3660
36601 Hermsdorf
36602 Ronneburg
36603 Weida
36604 Münchenbernsdorf
36605 Bad Köstritz
36606 Kraftsdorf
36607 Niederpöllnitz
36608 Seelingstädt
3661 Greiz
3662
36621 Elsterberg
36622 Triebes
36623 Berga/Elster
36624 Teichwolframsdorf
36625 Langenwetzendorf
36626 Auma
36628 Zeulenroda
3663 Schleiz
3664
36640 Remptendorf
36642 Harra
36643 Thimmendorf
36644 Hirschberg (Saale)
36645 Mühltroff
36646 Tanna
36647 Saalburg
36648 Dittersdorf
36649 Gefell
3665
36651 Bad Lobenstein
36652 Wurzbach
36653 Lehesten
3669
36691 Eisenberg (Thüringen)
36692 Bürgel
36693 Crossen
36694 Schkölen

367 – Saalfeld/Saale – Ilmenau – Sonneberg
3670
36701 Lichte
36702 Lauscha
36703 Gräfenthal
36704 Steinheid
36705 Oberweißbach
3671 Saalfeld/Saale
3672 Rudolstadt
3673
36730 Sitzendorf
36731 Unterloquitz
36732 Könitz
36733 Kaulsdorf (Saale)
36734 Leutenberg
36735 Probstzella
36736 Arnsgereuth
36737 Drognitz
36738 Königsee
36739 Rottenbach
3674
36741 Bad Blankenburg
36742 Uhlstädt
36743 Teichel
36744 Remda
3675 Sonneberg
3676
36761 Heubisch
36762 Steinach
36764 Neuhaus-Schierschnitz
36766 Schalkau
3677 Ilmenau
3678
36781 Großbreitenbach, Goldisthal and Katzhütte
36782 Schmiedefeld am Rennsteig
36783 Gehren
36784 Stützerbach
36785 Gräfinau-Angstedt
3679 Neuhaus am Rennweg

368 – Suhl and surroundings
3681 Suhl
3682 Zella-Mehlis
3683 Schmalkalden
3684
36840 Trusetal
36841 Schleusingen
36842 Oberhof
36843 Benshausen
36844 Rohr (Thüringen)
36845 Gehlberg
36846 Dietzhausen
36847 Steinbach-Hallenberg
36848 Wernshausen
36849 Kleinschmalkalden
3685 Hildburghausen
3686 Eisfeld
3687
36870 Masserberg
36871 Bad Colberg-Heldburg
36873 Themar
36874 Schönbrunn (Thüringen)
36875 Streufdorf
36878 Brattendorf

369 – Eisenach and surroundings
3691 Eisenach
3692
36920 Großenlupnitz
36921 Wutha-Farnroda
36922 Gerstungen
36923 Treffurt
36924 Mihla
36925 Marksuhl
36926 Creuzburg
36927 Unterellen
36928 Neuenhof
36929 Ruhla
3693 Meiningen
3694
36940 Oepfershausen
36941 Wasungen
36943 Bettenhausen
36944 Rentwertshausen
36945 Henneberg
36946 Reichenhausen
36947 Jüchsen
36948 Römhild
36949 Obermaßfeld
3695 Bad Salzungen
3696
36961 Bad Liebenstein
36962 Vacha
36963 Dorndorf
36964 Dermbach
36965 Stadtlengsfeld
36966 Kaltennordheim
36967 Geisa
36968 Roßdorf (Rhön)
36969 Merkers

37 – Chemnitz and surroundings

371/0372 - Chemnitz and surroundings
371 Chemnitz
372
3720
37200 Wittgensdorf
37202 Claußnitz
37203 Gersdorf
37204 Lichtenstein
37206 Frankenberg
37207 Hainichen
37208 Oberlichtenau
37209 Einsiedel
3721 Meinersdorf
3722 Limbach-Oberfrohna
3723 Hohenstein-Ernstthal
3724 Burgstädt
3725 Zschopau
3726 Flöha
3727 Mittweida
3729
37291 Augustusburg
37292 Oederan
37293 Eppendorf
37294 Grünhainichen
37295 Lugau/Erzgeb.
37296 Stollberg/Erzgeb.
37297 Thum
37298 Oelsnitz (Erzgebirge)

373 - Freiberg and surroundings
3731 Freiberg (Sachsen)
3732
37320 Mulda/Sa.
37321 Frankenstein
37322 Brand-Erbisdorf
37323 Lichtenberg
37324 Reinsberg
37325 Niederbobritzsch
37326 Frauenstein
37327 Rechenberg-Bienenmühle
37328 Großschirma
37329 Großhartmannsdorf
3733 Annaberg-Buchholz
3734
37341 Ehrenfriedersdorf
37342 Cranzahl
37343 Jöhstadt
37344 Crottendorf
37346 Geyer
37347 Bärenstein
37348 Oberwiesenthal
37349 Scheibenberg
3735 Marienberg
3736
37360 Olbernhau
37361 Neuhausen/Erzgeb.
37362 Seiffen/Erzgeb.
37363 Zöblitz
37364 Reitzenhain
37365 Sayda
37366 Rübenau
37367 Lengefeld
37368 Deutschneudorf
37369 Wolkenstein
3737 Rochlitz
3738
37381 Penig
37382 Geringswalde
37383 Lunzenau
37384 Wechselburg

374 - Plauen and surroundings
3741 Plauen
3742
37421 Oelsnitz (Vogtland)
37422 Markneukirchen
37423 Adorf (Vogtland)
3743
37430 Eichigt
37431 Mehltheuer (Vogtl.)
37432 Pausa/Vogtl.
37433 Gutenfürst
37434 Bobenneukirchen
37435 Reuth
37436 Weischlitz
37437 Bad Elster
37438 Bad Brambach
37439 Jocketa
3744 Auerbach/Vogtl.
3745 Falkenstein
3746
37462 Rothenkirchen (Vogtland)
37463 Bergen, Vogtlandkreis
37464 Schöneck/Vogtl.
37465 Tannenbergsthal
37467 Klingenthal
37468 Treuen

375/0376 - Zwickau and surroundings
375 Zwickau
376
3760
37600 Neumark (Sachsen)
37601 Mülsen St. Jacob
37602 Kirchberg (Sachsen)
37603 Wildenfels
37604 Mosel (Sachsen)
37605 Hartenstein
37606 Lengenfeld (Vogtland)
37607 Ebersbrunn
37608 Waldenburg
37609 Wolkenburg
3761 Werdau (Sachsen)
3762 Crimmitschau
3763 Glauchau
3764 Meerane
3765 Reichenbach im Vogtland

377 - Aue and surroundings
3771 Aue (Sachsen)
3772 Schneeberg (Erzgebirge)
3773 Johanngeorgenstadt
3774 Schwarzenberg/Erzgeb.
3775
37752 Eibenstock
37754 Zwönitz
37755 Schönheide (Erzgebirge)
37756 Breitenbrunn
37757 Rittersgrün

38 – Rostock and surroundings

381/0382 – Rostock and surroundings
381 Rostock
3820
38201 Gelbensande
38203 Bad Doberan
38204 Broderstorf
38205 Tessin
38206 Graal-Müritz
38207 Kritzmow
38208 Dummerstorf
38209 Sanitz
3821 Ribnitz-Damgarten, Ahrenshagen-Daskow
3822
38220 Ahrenshoop, Wustrow
38221 Marlow
38222 Ahrenshagen-Daskow-Gruel, -Tribohm, Semlow
38223 Ribnitz-Damgarten-Beiershagen, -Dechowshof, -Langendamm, Saal
38224 Marlow-div. Ortsteile
38225 Ahrenshagen-Daskow-Prusdorf, -Todenhagen, Schlemmin, Trinwillershagen
38226 Dierhagen
38227 Bartelshagen II, Spoldershagen, Lüdershagen, Saal-Hessenburg
3823
38231 Barth, Divitz, Fuhlendorf, Kenz-Küstrow, Löbnitz-Saatel, Pruchten, Groß Kordshagen
38232 Seeheilbad Zingst
38233 Prerow, Wieck
38234 Born
3829
38292 Kröpelin
38293 Kühlungsborn
38294 Neubukow
38295 Satow

383 – Stralsund/Greifswald and surroundings
3830
38300 Hiddensee
38301 Putbus
38302 Sagard, Lietzow, Glowe, Lohme
38303 Baabe, Sellin
38304 Garz/Rügen, Karnitz, Zudar
38305 Gingst
38306 Samtens, Rambin, Dreschvitz, Altefähr
38307 Poseritz, Gustow
38308 Ostseebad Göhren, Gager, Middelhagen, Thiessow
38309 Trent, Schaprode
3831 Stralsund, Kramerhof-Groß Kedingshagen, -Klein Kedingshagen, -Parow, -Vogelsang, Lüssow, Wendorf-Groß Lüdershagen, -Neu Lüdershagen, -Teschenhagen, -Zitterpenningshagen
3832
38320 Gremersdorf-Buchholz, Tribsees
38321 Kummerow, Neu Bartelshagen, Niepars, Pantelitz
38322 Franzburg, Gremersdorf-Buchholz-Grenzin, -Hohenbarnekow, -Neumühl, -Wolfsdorf, Millienhagen-Oebelitz, Richtenberg, Weitenhagen
38323 Altenpleen, Groß Mohrdorf, Klausdorf, Kramerhof, Preetz, Prohn
38324 Karnin, Löbnitz, Velgast
38325 Gremersdorf-Buchholz-Buchholz, -Eichholz, Papenhagen, Splietsdorf
38326 Grimmen, Süderholz-Barkow, -Bartmannshagen, -Boltenhagen, -Kandelin, -Kaschow, -Willerswalde, -Zarnewanz, Splietsdorf-Müggenwalde, Wendisch Baggendorf
38327 Elmenhorst, Wittenhagen, Jakobsdorf, Steinhagen, Wendorf, Zarrendorf
38328 Behnkendorf, Brandshagen, Miltzow, Reinberg
3833
38331 Süderholz-Bretwisch, -Dönnie, -Grabow, -Grischow, -Gölzow-Dorf, -Poggendorf, -Rakow, -Wüstenbilow
38332 Süderholz-Griebenow, -Groß Bisdorf, -Klein Bisdorf, -Klevenow, -Kreutzmannshagen, -Lüssow, -Neuendorf, -Prützmannshagen, -Schmietkow, -Willershusen, -Wüst Eldena, -Wüsteney
38333 Horst, Wilmshagen
38334 Glewitz
3834 Greifswald
3835
38351 Kirchdorf
3836 Wolgast
3837
38370 Kröslin, Freest
38371 Trassenheide, Karlshagen, Peenemünde
38372 Usedom
38375 Ückeritz
38376 Zirchow
38377 Zinnowitz
38378 Heringsdorf, Seebad Ahlbeck, Bansin
3838 Bergen auf Rügen, Buschvitz, Parchtitz, Patzig, Ralswiek, Rappin, Sehlen
3839
38391 Altenkirchen
38392 Sassnitz
38393 Binz, Zirkow

384 – Wismar and surroundings
3841 Wismar
3842
38422 Neukloster
38423 Bad Kleinen
38424 Bobitz
38425 Kirchdorf (Poel)
38426 Neuburg
38427 Blowatz
38428 Hohenkirchen
38429 Glasin
3843 Güstrow
3844 Schwaan
3845
38450 Tarnow
38451 Hoppenrade
38452 Lalendorf
38453 Mistorf
38454 Kritzkow
38455 Plaaz
38456 Langhagen
38457 Krakow am See
38458 Zehna
38459 Laage
3846
38461 Bützow
38462 Baumgarten
38464 Bernitt
38466 Jürgenshagen
3847 Sternberg
3848
38481 Witzin
38482 Warin
38483 Brüel
38484 Ventschow
38485 Dabel
38486 Gustävel
38488 Demen

385/0386 – Schwerin and surroundings
385 Schwerin
386
3860 Raben Steinfeld
3861 Plate
3863 Crivitz
3865 Holthusen
3866 Cambs
3867 Lübstorf
3868 Rastow
3869 Dümmer

387 - Parchim and surroundings
3871 Parchim
3872
38720 Grebbin
38721 Ziegendorf
38722 Raduhn
38723 Kladrum
38724 Siggelkow
38725 Groß Godems
38726 Spornitz
38727 Mestlin
38728 Domsühl
38729 Marnitz
3873
38731 Lübz
38732 Gallin
38733 Karbow
38735 Plau
38736 Goldberg (Mecklenburg)
38737 Ganzlin
38738 Karow (Mecklenburg)
3874 Ludwigslust
3875
38750 Malliss
38751 Picher
38752 Zierzow
38753 Wöbbelin
38754 Leussow
38755 Eldena
38756 Grabow (Mecklenburg)
38757 Neustadt-Glewe
38758 Dömitz
38759 Tewswoos
3876 Perleberg
3877 Wittenberge
3878
38780 Lanz
38781 Mellen
38782 Reetz
38783 Dallmin
38784 Kleinow
38785 Berge
38787 Glöwen
38788 Groß Warnow
38789 Wolfshagen
3879
38791 Bad Wilsnack
38792 Lenzen (Elbe)
38793 Dergenthin
38794 Cumlosen
38796 Viesecke
38797 Karstädt

388 - Grevesmühlen and surroundings
3881 Grevesmühlen
3882
38821 Lüdersdorf
38822 Rüting OT Diedrichshagen
38823 Selmsdorf
38824 Mallentin
38825 Klütz
38826 Dassow
38827 Kalkhorst
38828 Schönberg
3883 Hagenow
3884
38841 Amt Neuhaus
38842 Greven OT Lüttenmark
38843 Vellahn OT Bennin
38844 Neu Gülze
38845 Amt Neuhaus OT Kaarßen
38847 Boizenburg/Elbe
38848 Vellahn
3885
38850 Gammelin
38851 Zarrentin am Schaalsee
38852 Wittenburg
38853 Wittendörp OT Drönnewitz
38854 Redefin
38855 Lübtheen
38856 Pritzier
38858 Zarrentin am Schaalsee OT Lassahn
38859 Alt Zachun
3886 Gadebusch
3887
38871 Mühlen Eichsen
38872 Rehna
38873 Carlow
38874 Lützow
38875 Schlagsdorf
38876 Roggendorf

39 - Magdeburg, Neubrandenburg, and surroundings

390 - Salzwedel and surroundings
390
3900
39000 Beetzendorf
39001 Apenburg
39002 Oebisfelde
39003 Jübar
39004 Köckte bei Gardelegen
39005 Kusey
39006 Miesterhorst
39007 Tangeln
39008 Kunrau
39009 Badel
3901 Salzwedel
3902 Diesdorf
3903
39030 Brunau
39031 Dähre
39032 Mahlsdorf bei Salzwedel
39033 Wallstawe
39034 Fleetmark
39035 Kuhfelde
39036 Binde
39037 Pretzier
39038 Henningen
39039 Bonese
3904 Haldensleben
3905
39050 Bartensleben
39051 Calvörde
39052 Erxleben bei Haldensleben
39053 Süplingen
39054 Flechtingen
39055 Hörsingen
39056 Klüden
39057 Rätzlingen, Saxony-Anhalt
39058 Uthmöden
39059 Wegenstedt
3906
39061 Weferlingen
39062 Bebertal
3907 Gardelegen
3908
39080 Kalbe an der Milde
39081 Kakerbeck Sachsen-Anhalt
39082 Mieste
39083 Messdorf
39084 Lindstedt
39085 Zichtau
39086 Jävenitz
39087 Jerchel
39088 Letzlingen
39089 Bismark
3909 Klötze Altmark

391/0392 – Magdeburg and surroundings
391 Magdeburg
392
3920
39200 Gommern
39201 Wolmirstedt
39202 Groß Ammensleben
39203 Barleben
39204 Niederndodeleben
39205 Langenweddingen
39206 Eichenbarleben
39207 Colbitz
39208 Loitsche
39209 Wanzleben
3921 Burg bei Magdeburg
3922
39221 Möckern
39222 Möser
39223 Theessen
39224 Büden
39225 Altengrabow
39226 Hohenziatz
3923 Zerbst/Anhalt
3924
39241 Leitzkau
39242 Prödel
39243 Nedlitz (Jerichower Land)
39244 Steutz
39245 Loburg
39246 Lindau (Anhalt)
39247 Güterglück
39248 Dobritz
3925 Staßfurt
3926
39262 Güsten
39263 Unseburg
39264 Kroppenstedt
39265 Löderburg
39266 Förderstedt
39267 Schneidlingen
39268 Egeln
3928 Schönebeck (Elbe)
3929
39291 Calbe (Saale)
39292 Biederitz
39293 Dreileben
39294 Groß Rosenburg
39295 Zuchau
39296 Welsleben
39297 Eickendorf
39298 Barby

393 – Stendal and surroundings
3931 Stendal
3932
39320 Schinne
39321 Arneburg
39322 Tangermünde
39323 Schönhausen (Elbe)
39324 Kläden
39325 Vinzelberg
39327 Klietz
39328 Rochau
39329 Möringen
3933 Genthin
3934
39341 Redekin
39342 Gladau
39343 Jerichow
39344 Güsen
39345 Parchen
39346 Tucheim
39347 Kade
39348 Klitsche
39349 Parey (Elbe)
3935 Tangerhütte
3936
39361 Lüderitz (bei Stendal)
39362 Grieben (Sachsen-Anhalt)
39363 Angern
39364 Dolle
39365 Bellingen
39366 Kehnert
3937 Osterburg
3938
39382 Kamern
39383 Sandau
39384 Arendsee (Altmark)
39386 Seehausen (Altmark)
39387 Havelberg
39388 Goldbeck (Altmark)
3939
39390 Iden
39391 Lückstedt
39392 Rönnebeck
39393 Werben (Elbe)
39394 Hohenberg-Krusemark
39395 Wanzer
39396 Neukirchen (Altmark)
39397 Geestgottberg
39398 Groß Garz
39399 Kleinau

394 – Halberstadt and surroundings
3940
39400 Wefensleben
39401 Neuwegersleben
39402 Völpke
39403 Gröningen
39404 Ausleben
39405 Hötensleben
39406 Harbke
39407 Seehausen (Börde)
39408 Hadmersleben
39409 Eilsleben
3941 Halberstadt
3942
39421 Osterwieck
39422 Badersleben
39423 Wegeleben
39424 Schwanebeck
39425 Dingelstedt
39426 Hessen am Fallstein
39427 Schachdorf Ströbeck
39428 Pabstorf
3943 Wernigerode
3944 Blankenburg (Harz)
3945
39451 Wasserleben
39452 Ilsenburg
39453 Derenburg
39454 Elbingerode
39455 Schierke
39456 Altenbrak
39457 Benneckenstein
39458 Heudeber
39459 Hasselfelde
3946 Quedlinburg
3947 Thale
3948
39481 Hedersleben
39482 Gatersleben
39483 Ballenstedt
39484 Harzgerode
39485 Gernrode
39487 Friedrichsbrunn
39488 Güntersberge
39489 Straßberg
3949 Oschersleben (Bode)

395/396 – Neubrandenburg and surroundings
395 Neubrandenburg
396
3960
39600 Zwiedorf
39601 Friedland, Mecklenburg-Vorpommern
39602 Kleeth
39603 Burg Stargard
39604 Wildberg
39605 Groß Nemerow
39606 Glienke
39607 Kotelow
39608 Staven
3961 Altentreptow
3962 Penzlin
3963 Woldegk
3964 Bredenfelde
3965 Burow
3966 Cölpin
3967 Oertzenhof (Mecklenburg-Strelitz)
3968 Schönbeck
3969 Siedenbollentin

397 – Anklam and surroundings
3971 Anklam
3972
39721 Liepen
39722 Sarnow
39723 Krien
39724 Klein Bünzow
39726 Ducherow
39727 Spantekow
39728 Medow
3973 Pasewalk
3974
39740 Nechlin
39741 Jatznick
39742 Brüssow
39743 Zerrenthin
39744 Rothenklempenow
39745 Hetzdorf (Uckermark)
39746 Krackow
39747 Züsedom
39748 Viereck
39749 Grambow
3975
39751 Penkun
39752 Blumenhagen
39753 Strasburg
39754 Löcknitz
3976 Torgelow
3977
39771 Ueckermünde
39772 Rothemühl
39773 Altwarp
39774 Mönkebude
39775 Ahlbeck (Uecker-Randow)
39776 Hintersee
39777 Borkenfriede
39778 Ferdinandshof
39779 Eggesin

398 – Neustrelitz and surroundings
3981 Neustrelitz
3982
39820 Triepkendorf
39821 Carpin
39822 Kratzeburg
39823 Rechlin
39824 Hohenzieritz
39825 Wokuhl-Dabelow
39826 Blankensee
39827 Schwarz
39828 Wustrow
39829 Blankenförde
3983
39831 Feldberg
39832 Wesenberg
39833 Mirow
3984 Prenzlau
3985
39851 Göritz
39852 Schönermark (Nordwestuckermark)
39853 Holzendorf
39854 Kleptow
39855 Weggun
39856 Beenz
39857 Drense
39858 Bietikow
39859 Fürstenwerder
3986
39861 Gramzow
39862 Schmölln
39863 Seehausen (Uckermark)
3987 Templin
3988
39881 Ringenwalde
39882 Gollin
39883 Groß Dölln
39884 Haßleben
39885 Jakobshagen
39886 Milmersdorf
39887 Gerswalde
39888 Lychen
39889 Boitzenburg

399 – Waren and surroundings
3991 Waren (Müritz)
3992
39921 Ankershagen
39922 Dambeck
39923 Priborn
39924 Stuer
39925 Wredenhagen
39926 Grabowhöfe
39927 Nossentiner Hütte
39928 Möllenhagen
39929 Jabel
3993
39931 Röbel/Müritz
39932 Malchow
39933 Vollrathsruhe
39934 Klein Plasten
3994 Malchin
3995
39951 Faulenrost
39952 Grammentin
39953 Schwinkendorf
39954 Stavenhagen
39955 Jürgenstorf
39956 Neukalen
39957 Gielow
39959 Dargun
3996 Teterow
3997
39971 Gnoien
39972 Walkendorf
39973 Altkalen
39975 Thürkow
39976 Groß Bützin
39977 Jördenstorf
39978 Groß Roge
3998 Demmin
3999
39991 Daberkow
39992 Görmin
39993 Hohenmocker
39994 Metschow
39995 Nossendorf
39996 Törpin
39997 Jarmen
39998 Loitz
39999 Tutow

4

40 – Hamburg and surroundings
40 Hamburg, Norderstedt, Neu Wulmstorf

41 – Further surroundings of Hamburg

0410 – calling areas immediately bordering Hamburg 
4101 Pinneberg
4102 Ahrensburg
4103 Wedel
4104 Aumühle
4105 Seevetal
4106 Quickborn (Kreis Pinneberg)
4107 Siek (Holstein)
4108 Rosengarten, Lower Saxony
4109 Tangstedt

411 – currently unassigned
currently unassigned (was Hamburg)

412 – Elmshorn and surroundings
4120 Ellerhoop
4121 Elmshorn
4122 Tornesch, Uetersen, Moorrege, Heist, Heidgraben and Groß Nordende
4123 Barmstedt
4124 Glückstadt
4125 Seestermühe
4126 Horst
4127 Brande-Hörnerkirchen, Westerhorn
4128 Kollmar
4129 Haseldorf

413 – Lüneburg and surroundings
4131 Lüneburg
4132 Amelinghausen
4133 Wittorf, Handorf
4134 Embsen
4135 Kirchgellersen
4136 Scharnebeck
4137 Barendorf
4138 Betzendorf
4139 Hohnstorf

414 – Stade and surroundings
4140 Estorf
4141 Stade
4142 Steinkirchen
4143 Drochtersen
4144 Himmelpforten
4146 Stade-Bützfleth
4148 Drochtersen-Assel
4149 Fredenbeck

415 – Lauenburg and surroundings
4151 Schwarzenbek
4152 Geesthacht
4153 Lauenburg
4154 Trittau
4155 Büchen
4156 Talkau
4158 Roseburg
4159 Basthorst

416 – Buxtehude and surroundings
4161 Buxtehude
4162 Jork
4163 Horneburg
4164 Harsefeld
4165 Hollenstedt
4166 Ahlerstedt
4167 Apensen
4168 Neu Wulmstorf-Elstorf
4169 Sauensiek

417 – Winsen and surroundings
4171 Winsen (Luhe)
4172 Salzhausen
4173 Wulfsen
4174 Stelle (Landkreis Harburg)
4175 Egestorf
4176 Marschacht
4177 Drage
4178 Radbruch
4179 Winsen-Tönnhausen

418 – Buchholz and surroundings
4180 Königsmoor
4181 Buchholz in der Nordheide
4182 Tostedt
4183 Jesteburg
4184 Hanstedt
4185 Marxen
4186 Buchholz-Trelde, Buchholz-Sprötze
4187 Holm-Seppensen
4188 Welle
4189 Undeloh

419 – Kaltenkirchen and surroundings
4191 Kaltenkirchen
4192 Bad Bramstedt
4193 Henstedt-Ulzburg
4194 Sievershütten
4195 Hartenholm

42 – Bremen and surroundings

420 – Oyten and surroundings
4202 Achim
4203 Weyhe
4204 Thedinghausen
4205 Ottersberg
4206 Stuhr-Heiligenrode
4207 Oyten
4208 Grasberg
4209 Schwanewede

421 – Bremen and surroundings
421 Bremen

422 – Delmenhorst and surroundings
4221 Delmenhorst
4222 Ganderkesee
4223 Ganderkesee-Bookholzberg
4224 Groß Ippener

423 – Verden and surroundings
4230 Verden (Aller)-Walle
4231 Verden (Aller)
4232 Langwedel (Kreis Verden (Aller))
4233 Blender
4234 Dörverden
4235 Langwedel (Kreis Verden (Aller))
4236 Kirchlinteln
4237 Kirchlinteln-Bendingbostel
4238 Kirchlinteln-Neddenaverbergen
4239 Dörverden-Westen

424 – Syke and surroundings
4241 Bassum
4242 Syke
4243 Twistringen
4244 Harpstedt
4245 Scholen
4246 Drentwede
4247 Sudwalde/Affinghausen
4249 Nordwohlde

425 – Eystrup and surroundings
4251 Hoya
4252 Bruchhausen-Vilsen
4253 Asendorf (Samtgemeinde Bruchhausen-Vilsen)
4254 Eystrup
4255 Martfeld (Samtgemeinde Bruchhausen-Vilsen)
4256 Hilgermissen
4257 Schweringen
4258 Schwarme (Samtgemeinde Bruchhausen-Vilsen)

426 – Rotenburg and surroundings
4260 Visselhövede-Wittorf
4261 Rotenburg (Wümme)
4262 Visselhövede
4263 Scheeßel
4264 Sottrum (Kreis Rotenburg (Wümme))
4265 Fintel
4266 Brockel (Samtgemeinde Bothel)
4267 Lauenbrück (Samtgemeinde Fintel)
4268 Bötersen (Samtgemeinde Sottrum)
4269 Ahausen-Kirchwalsede (Samtgemeinden Bothel and Sottrum)

427 – Sulingen and surroundings
4271 Sulingen
4272 Siedenburg
4273 Kirchdorf
4274 Varrel (Samtgemeinde Kirchdorf)
4275 Ehrenburg (Samtgemeinde Schwaförden)
4276 Borstel (Samtgemeinde Siedenburg)
4277 Schwaförden

428 – Zeven and surroundings
4281 Zeven
4282 Sittensen
4283 Tarmstedt
4284 Selsingen
4285 Rhade (Samtgemeinde Selsingen)
4286 Gyhum (Samtgemeinde Zeven)
4287 Heeslingen-Boitzen (Samtgemeinde Zeven)
4288 Horstedt (Samtgemeinde Sottrum)
4289 Kirchtimke (Samtgemeinde Tarmstedt)

429 – Ottersberg and surroundings
4292 Ritterhude
4293 Ottersberg-Fischerhude
4294 Riede (Samtgemeinde Thedinghausen)
4295 Emtinghausen (Samtgemeinde Thedinghausen)
4296 Schwanewede-Aschwarden
4297 Ottersberg-Posthausen
4298 Lilienthal

43 – Kiel and surroundings

430 – Raisdorf and surroundings
4301 (not assigned)
4302 Kirchbarkau
4303 Schlesen
4304 (not assigned)
4305 Westensee
4306 (not assigned)
4307 Raisdorf
4308 Schwedeneck
4309 (not assigned)

431 – Kiel and surroundings
431 Kiel

432 – Neumünster and surroundings
4320 Heidmühlen
4321 Neumünster
4322 Bordesholm
4323 Bornhöved
4324 Brokstedt
4325 (not assigned)
4326 Wankendorf
4327 Großenaspe
4328 Rickling
4329 Langwedel

433 – Rendsburg and surroundings
4330 Emkendorf
4331 Rendsburg
4332 Hamdorf
4333 Erfde
4334 Bredenbek
4335 Hohn
4336 Owschlag
4337 Jevenstedt
4338 Alt Duvenstedt
4339 Christiansholm

434 – Laboe and surroundings
4340 Achterwehr
4341 (not assigned)
4342 Kühren, Lehmkuhlen, Preetz
4343 Laboe
4344 Schönberg
4345 (not assigned)
4346 Gettorf
4347 Flintbek
4348 Schönkirchen
4349 Dänischenhagen

435 – Eckernförde and surroundings
4350 (not assigned)
4351 Eckernförde
4352 Damp
4353 Ascheffel
4354 Fleckeby
4355 Rieseby
4356 Groß Wittensee
4357 Sehestedt
4358 Loose
4359 (not assigned)

436 – Oldenburg and surroundings
4360 (not assigned)
4361 Oldenburg
4362 Heiligenhafen
4363 Lensahn
4364 Dahme
4365 Heringsdorf
4366 Grömitz-Cismar
4367 Großenbrode
4368 (not assigned)
4368 (not assigned)

437 – Fehmarn and surroundings
4370 (not assigned)
4371 Burg auf Fehmarn
4372 Fehmarn
4373 (not assigned)
4374 (not assigned)
4375 (not assigned)
4376 (not assigned)
4377 (not assigned)
4378 (not assigned)
4379 (not assigned)

438 – Lütjenburg and surroundings
4380 (not assigned)
4381 Lütjenburg
4382 Wangels
4383 Grebin
4384 Selent
4385 Hohenfelde
4386 (not assigned)
4387 (not assigned)
4388 (not assigned)
4389 (not assigned)

439 – Nortorf and surroundings
4390 (not assigned)
4391 (not assigned)
4392 Nortorf
4393 Boostedt
4394 Bokhorst
4395 (not assigned)
4396 (not assigned)
4397 (not assigned)
4398 (not assigned)
4399 (not assigned)

44 – Oldenburg and surroundings

440 – Brake and surroundings
4401 Brake/Unterweser
4402 Rastede/Wiefelstede
4404 Elsfleth
4405 Edewecht
4406 Berne
4407 Wardenburg
4408 Hude

441 – Oldenburg and surroundings
441 Oldenburg (Oldb.)

442 – Wilhelmshaven and surroundings
4421 Wilhelmshaven
4422 Sande (Friesland) Kr.Friesl
4423 Fedderwarden (Wilhelmshaven)
4425 Wangerland-Hooksiel
4426 Wangerland-Horumersiel

443 – Wildeshausen and surroundings
4431 Wildeshausen
4432 Doetlingen-Brettorf
4433 Doetlingen
4434 Colnrade
4435 Großenkneten

444 – Vechta and surroundings
4441 Vechta
4442 Lohne Oldb.
4443 Dinklage
4444 Goldenstedt
4445 Visbek Kr.Vechta
4446 Bakum Kr.Vechta
4447 Vechta-Langförden

445 – Varel and surroundings
4451 Varel Jadebusen
4452 Zetel-Neuenburg
4453 Zetel
4454 Jade
4455 Jade-Schweiburg
4456 Varel-Altjührden
4458 Wiefelstede-Spohle

446 – Friesland and surroundings
4461 Jever
4462 Wittmund
4463 Wangerland
4464 Wittmund-Carolinensiel
4465 Friedeburg Ostfriesland
4466 Wittmund-Ardorf
4467 Wittmund-Funnix
4468 Friedeburg-Reepsholt
4469 Wangerooge

447 – Cloppenburg and surroundings
4471 Cloppenburg
4472 Lastrup
4473 Emstek
4474 Garrel
4475 Molbergen
4477 Lastrup-Hemmelte
4478 Cappeln Oldb.
4479 Molbergen-Peheim
4480 Ovelgoenne-Strückhausen

448 – Westerstede and surroundings
4481 Hatten-Sandkrug
4482 Hatten
4483 Ovelgoenne-Grossenmeer
4484 Hude-Wüsting
4485 Elsfleth-Huntorf
4486 Edewecht-Friedrichsfehn
4487 Grossenkneten-Huntlosen
4488 Westerstede
4489 Apen

449 – Friesoythe and surroundings
4491 Friesoythe
4492 Saterland
4493 Friesoythe-Gehlenberg
4494 Bösel b.Friesoythe
4495 Friesoythe-Thuele
4496 Friesoythe-Markhausen
4497 Barßel-Harkebrügge
4498 Saterland-Ramsloh
4499 Barßel

45 – Lübeck and surroundings

450 – Kastorf and surroundings
4501 Kastorf
4502 Lübeck-Travemünde
4503 Timmendorfer Strand
4504 Ratekau
4505 Stockelsdorf-Curau
4506 Heilshoop
4507 not assigned
4508 Krummesse
4509 Groß Grönau

451 – Lübeck and surroundings
451 1 – Lübeck, Bad Schwartau, Stockelsdorf
451 2 – Bad Schwartau
451 3 – St. Gertrud (Nord), Schlutup, Kücknitz
451 4 – St. Lorenz-Nord, Stockelsdorf
451 5 – St. Jürgen (Süd)
451 6 – St. Gertrud (Süd)
451 7 – Innenstadt, St. Jürgen (Nord)
451 8 – St. Lorenz-Süd, Buntekuh, Moisling

452 – Plön and surroundings
4521 Eutin
4522 Plön
4523 Bad Malente-Gremsmühlen
4524 Süsel
4525 Ahrensbök
4526 Ascheberg
4527 Bosau
4528 Schönwalde am Bungsberg
4529 not assigned

453 – Lauenburg and surroundings
4531 Bad Oldesloe
4532 Bargteheide
4533 Reinfeld in Holstein
4534 Schönberg, Kreis Herzogtum Lauenburg
4535 Kayhude
4536 Sandesneben
4537 Grabau
4538 not assigned
4539 Rethwisch

454 – Salem and surroundings
4541 Ratzeburg
4542 Mölln
4543 Nusse
4544 Berkenthin
4545 Salem
4546 Mustin
4547 Gudow in Lauenburg
4548 not assigned
4549 not assigned

455 – Bad Segeberg and surroundings
4551 Bad Segeberg
4552 Bebensee
4553 Geschendorf
4554 Wahlstedt
4555 Seedorf bei Bad Segeberg
4556 Travenhorst
4557 Tensfeld
4558 Fredesdorf
4559 Wensin

456 – Neustadt and surroundings
4561 Neustadt in Holstein
4562 Grömitz
4563 Sierksdorf
4564 Schashagen
4565 not assigned
4566 not assigned
4567 not assigned
4568 not assigned
4569 not assigned
457
not assigned
458
not assigned
459
not assigned

46 – Flensburg and surroundings

460/0461 – Flensburg and surroundings
460
4602 Freienwill
4603 Havetoft
4604 Grossenwiehe
4605 Medelby
4606 Wanderup
4607 Janneby
4608 Handewitt
4609 Eggebek
461 Flensburg

462 – Schleswig and surroundings
4621 Schleswig
4622 Taarstedt
4623 Böklund
4624 Kropp
4625 Jübek
4626 Treia
4627 Dörpstedt

463 – Glücksburg and surroundings
4630 Barderup
4631 Glücksburg (Ostsee)
4632 Steinbergkirche
4633 Satrup
4634 Husby
4635 Sörup
4636 Langballig
4637 Sterup
4638 Tarp
4639 Schafflund

464 – Kappeln and surroundings
4641 Süderbrarup
4642 Kappeln an der Schlei
4643 Gelting (Angeln)
4644 Karby Schwansen
4646 Mohrkirch

465 – Sylt
4651 Sylt

466 – Niebüll and surroundings
4661 Niebüll
4662 Leck
4663 Süderlügum
4664 Neukirchen bei Niebüll
4665 Emmelsbüll-Horsbüll
4666 Ladelund
4667 Dagebüll
4668 Klanxbüll

467 – Langenhorn and surroundings
4671 Bredstedt
4672 Langenhorn
4673 Joldelund
4674 Ockholm

468 – Föhr
4681 Wyk auf Föhr
4682 Amrum
4683 Oldsum
4684 Langeneß (Hallig)

47 – Bremerhaven and surroundings

470 – Sandstedt and surroundings
4702 Sandstedt
4703 Loxstedt-Donnern
4704 Drangstedt
4705 Wremen
4706 Schiffdorf
4707 Langen-Neuenwalde
4708 Ringstedt

471 – Bremerhaven and surroundings
471 Bremerhaven

472 – Cuxhaven and surroundings
4721 Cuxhaven
4722 Cuxhaven-Altenbruch
4723 Cuxhaven-Altenwalde
4724 Cuxhaven-Lüdingworth
4725 Helgoland

473 – Nordenham and surroundings
4731 Nordenham
4732 Stadland-Rodenkirchen
4733 Butjadingen-Burhave
4734 Stadland-Seefeld
4735 Butjadingen-Stollhamm
4736 Butjadingen-Tossens
4737 Stadland-Schwei

474 – Loxstedt and surroundings
4740 Loxstedt-Dedesdorf
4741 Nordholz b.Bremerhaven
4742 Dorum
4743 Langen b.Bremerhaven
4744 Loxstedt
4745 Bad Bederkesa
4746 Hagen b.Bremerhaven
4747 Beverstedt
4748 Stubben b.Bremerhaven
4749 Schiffdorf-Geestenseth

475 – Otterndorf and surroundings
4751 Otterndorf
4752 Neuhaus (Oste)
4753 Balje
4754 Bülkau
4755 Ihlienworth
4756 Odisheim
4757 Wanna
4758 Nordleda

476 – Bremervörde and surroundings
4761 Bremervörde
4762 Kutenholz
4763 Gnarrenburg
4764 Gnarrenburg-Klenkendorf
4765 Ebersdorf b.Bremervörde
4766 Basdahl
4767 Bremervörde-Bevern
4768 Hipstedt
4769 Bremervörde-Iselersheim

477 – Freiburg and surroundings
4770 Wischhafen
4771 Hemmoor
4772 Oberndorf Oste
4773 Lamstedt
4774 Hechthausen
4775 Grossenwörden
4776 Osten-Altendorf
4777 Cadenberge
4778 Wingst
4779 Freiburg an der Elbe

479 – Osterholz-Scharmbeck and surroundings
4791 Osterholz-Scharmbeck
4792 Worpswede (Landkreis Osterholz)
4793 Hambergen
4794 Worpswede-Ostersode
4795 Garlstedt
4796 Teufelsmoor

48 – Heide and surroundings

480 – Dithmarschen and surroundings
4802 Dellstedt, Wrohm
4803 Delve, Pahlen
4804 Nordhastedt
4805 Schafstedt
4806 Bargenstedt, Odderade, Sarzbüttel

481 – Heide and surroundings
481 Heide

482 – Itzehoe and surroundings
4821 Itzehoe
4822 Kellinghusen
4823 Wilster
4824 Krempe
4825 Burg
4826 Hohenlockstedt
4827 Wacken
4828 Lägerdorf
4829 Wewelsfleth, Brokdorf

483 – Neuenkirchen and surroundings
4830 Süderhastedt
4832 Meldorf
4833 Wesselburen
4834 Büsum
4835 Albersdorf Holstein
4836 Hennstedt, Dithmarschen
4837 Neuenkirchen
4838 Tellingstedt
4839 Wöhrden, Dithmarschen

484 – Husum and surroundings
4841 Husum
4842 Nordstrand
4843 Viöl
4844 Pellworm
4845 Ostenfeld
4846 Hattstedt
4847 Oster-Ohrstedt
4848 Rantrum
4849 Hooge (Hallig)

485 – Brunsbüttel and surroundings
4851 Marne
4852 Brunsbüttel
4853 Sankt Michaelisdonn
4854 Friedrichskoog
4855 Eddelak
4856 Kronprinzenkoog
4857 Barlt
4858 Sankt Margarethen
4859 Windbergen

486 – St. Peter-Ording and surroundings
4861 Tönning
4862 Garding
4863 Sankt Peter-Ording
4864 Oldenswort
4865 Osterhever

487 - Hohenwestedt and surroundings
4871 Hohenwestedt
4872 Hanerau-Hademarschen
4873 Aukrug
4874 Todenbüttel
4875 Stafstedt
4876 Reher
4877 Hennstedt bei Itzehoe

488 - Friedrichstadt and surroundings
4881 Friedrichstadt
4882 Lunden
4883 Süderstapel
4884 Schwabstedt
4885 Bergenhusen

489 - Town and surroundings
4892 Schenefeld Mittelholstein
4893 Hohenaspe

49 – Emden and surroundings

490 – Wymeer and surroundings
4902 Jemgum-Ditzum
4903 Wymeer (see German-language entry)

491 – Leer and surroundings
491 Leer

492 – Emden and surroundings
4920 Wirdum 
4921 Emden
4922 Borkum
4923 Krummhörn-Pewsum
4924 Moormerland-Oldersum
4925 Hinte
4926 Krummhörn-Greetsiel
4927 Krummhörn-Loquard
4928 Ihlow-Riepe
4929 Ihlow

493 – Norden and surroundings
4931 Norden
4932 Norderney
4933 Dornum Ostfriesland
4934 Marienhafe
4935 Juist
4936 Grossheide
4938 Hagermarsch
4939 Baltrum

494 – Aurich and surroundings
4941 Aurich
4942 Südbrookmerland
4943 Großefehn
4944 Wiesmoor
4945 Großefehn-Timmel
4946 Großefehn-Bagband
4947 Aurich-Ogenbargen
4948 Wiesmoor-Marcardsmoor

495 – Rhauderfehn and surroundings
4950 Holtland
4951 Weener
4952 Rhauderfehn
4953 Bunde
4954 Moormerland
4955 Westoverledingen
4956 Uplengen
4957 Detern
4958 Jemgum
4959 Dollart

496 – Papenburg and surroundings
4961 Papenburg
4962 Aschendorf
4963 Dörpen
4964 Rhede (Ems)
4965 Surwold
4966 Neubörger
4967 Rhauderfehn-Burlage
4968 Neulehe

497 – Esens and surroundings
4971 Esens
4972 Langeoog
4973 Wittmund-Burhafe
4974 Neuharlingersiel
4975 Westerholt
4976 Spiekeroog
4977 Blomberg

5

50 – Nienburg-Wunstorf-Springe and surroundings
502
5021 Nienburg (Weser)
5022 Wietzen
5023 Liebenau (bei Nienburg)
5024 Rohrsen
5025 Estorf (Weser)
5026 Steimbke
5027 Linsburg
5028 Pennigsehl
503
5031 Wunstorf
5032 Neustadt am Rübenberge
5033 Großenheidorn, Steinhude and Altenhagen/Hagenburg
5034 Hagen (bei Neustadt am Rübenberge)
5036 Schneeren
5037 Bad Rehburg
504
5041 Springe (Deister)
5042 Bad Münder am Deister
5043 Lauenau
5044 Eldagsen
5045 Bennigsen
505
5051 Bergen, Lower Saxony (bei Celle)
5052 Hermannsburg
5053 Müden (Aller)
5054 Sülze
5055 Fassberg
5056 Meissendorf
506
5060 Bodenburg
5062 Holle (bei Hildesheim)
5063 Bad Salzdetfurth
5064 Groß Düngen
5065 Sibbesse
5066 Sarstedt
5067 Bockenem
5068 Elze (Leine)
5069 Nordstemmen
507
5071 Schwarmstedt
5072 Mandelsloh
5073 Esperke
5074 Rodewald
508
5082 Langlingen
5083 Hohne (bei Celle)
5084 Hambühren
5085 Ehlershausen
5086 Scheuen

51 – Hannover and surroundings
510
5101 Pattensen
5102 Laatzen
5103 Wennigsen (Deister)
5105 Barsinghausen
5108 Gehrden
5109 Ronnenberg
511 Hannover
512
5121 Hildesheim
5123 Schellerten
5126 Algermissen
5127 Harsum
5128 Hohenhameln
5129 Söhlde
513
5130 Wedemark
5131 Garbsen
5132 Lehrte
5135 Fuhrberg
5136 Burgdorf (Hannover)
5137 Seelze
5138 Sehnde
5139 Burgwedel
514
5141 Celle
5142 Eschede
5143 Winsen (Aller)
5144 Wathlingen
5145 Beedenbostel
5147 Häningsen
5146 Weitze
5148 Steinhorst (Nieders.)
5149 Wienhausen
515
5151 Hameln
5152 Hessisch Oldendorf
5153 Salzhemmendorf
5154 Aerzen
5155 Emmerthal
5156 Coppenbrügge
5157 Börry
5158 Hemeringen
5159 Bisperode
516
5161 Walsrode
5162 Bad Fallingbostel
5163 Dorfmark
5164 Hodenhagen
5165 Rethem (Aller)
5166 Kirchboitzen
5167 Westenholz
5168 Stellichte
517
5171 Peine
5172 Ilsede
5173 Uetze
5174 Lahstedt
5175 Arpke
5176 Edemissen
5177 Abbensen
518
5181 Alfeld (Leine)
5182 Gronau (Leine)
5183 Lamspringe
5184 Freden (Leine)
5185 Duingen
5186 Wallensen
5187 Delligsen
519
5190 Emmingen
5191 Soltau
5192 Munster
5193 Schneverdingen
5194 Bispingen
5196 Wietzendorf
5197 Frielingen
5198 Wintermoor
5199 Heber

52 – Bielefeld and surroundings
520
5200 (not assigned)
5201 Halle (Westf.)
5202 Oerlinghausen
5203 Werther (Westfalen)
5204 Steinhagen (Westfalen)
5205 Sennestadt (Stadt Bielefeld)
5206 Jöllenbeck, Theesen (Stadt Bielefeld)
5207 Schloß Holte-Stukenbrock
5208 Leopoldshöhe
5209 Friedrichsdorf (Stadt Gütersloh)
521 Bielefeld
522
5220 (not assigned)
5221 Herford
5222 Bad Salzuflen
5223 Bünde
5224 Enger (Westfalen)
5225 Spenge
5226 Bruchmühlen (Westfalen, Gemeinde Rödinghausen/Nordrhein-Westfalen bzw. Stadt Melle/Niedersachsen)
5227 (not assigned)
5228 Vlotho/Exter (Stadt Vlotho)
5229 (not assigned)
523
5230 (not assigned)
5231 Detmold
5232 Lage
5233 Steinheim (Westfalen)
5234 Horn-Bad Meinberg
5235 Blomberg (Lippe)
5236 Großenmarpe (Gemeinde Blomberg (Lippe))
5237 Augustdorf
5238 Himmighausen (Gemeinde Nieheim)
5239 (not assigned)
524
5240 (not assigned)
5241 Gütersloh
5242 Rheda-Wiedenbrück
5243 (not assigned)
5244 Rietberg
5245 Herzebrock-Clarholz
5246 Verl
5247 Harsewinkel
5248 Langenberg
5249 (not assigned)
525
5250 Delbrück (Westfalen)
5251 Paderborn
5252 Bad Lippspringe
5253 Bad Driburg
5254 Schloß Neuhaus (Stadt Paderborn)
5255 Altenbeken
5257 Hövelhof
5258 Salzkotten
5259 Neuenheerse (Stadt Bad Driburg)
526
5260 (not assigned)
5261 Lemgo
5262 Extertal
5263 Barntrup
5264 Kalletal
5265 Dörentrup
5266 Kirchheide (Stadt Lemgo)
5267 (not assigned)
5268 (not assigned)
5269 (not assigned)
527
5270 (not assigned)
5271 Höxter, Boffzen, Fürstenberg
5272 Brakel (Westfalen)
5273 Beverungen, Lauenförde, Derental
5274 Nieheim
5275 Ottbergen (Stadt Höxter)
5276 Marienmünster
5277 Fürstenau (Stadt Höxter)
5278 Ovenhausen (Stadt Höxter)
5279 (not assigned)
528
5281 Bad Pyrmont
5282 Schieder-Schwalenberg
5283 Lügde -Rischenau
5284 Schwalenberg (Gemeinde Schieder-Schwalenberg)
5285 Kleinenberg
5286 Ottenstein
5287 (not assigned)
5288 (not assigned)
5289 (not assigned)
529
5291 (not assigned)
5292 Atteln (Stadt Lichtenau)
5293 Dahl (Stadt Paderborn)
5294 Espeln (Gemeinde Hövelhof)
5295 Lichtenau
5296 (not assigned)
5297 (not assigned)
5298 (not assigned)
5299 (not assigned)

53 – Braunschweig and surroundings
530
5300 Üfingen
5301 Lehre-Essenrode
5302 Vechelde
5303 Wendeburg
5304 Meine
5305 Sickte
5306 Cremlingen
5307 Braunschweig-Wenden
5308 Lehre
5309 Lehre-Wendhausen
531 Braunschweig
532
5320 Torfhaus
5321 Goslar
5322 Bad Harzburg
5323 Clausthal-Zellerfeld
5324 Vienenburg
5325 Hahnenklee
5326 Langelsheim
5327 Bad Grund (Harz)
5328 Altenau (Harz)
5329 Schulenberg (Oberharz)
533
5331 Wolfenbüttel
5332 Schöppenstedt
5333 Dettum
5334 Hornburg (bei Wolfenbüttel)
5335 Schladen
5336 Semmenstedt
5337 Kissenbrück
5339 Gielde
534
5341 Salzgitter
5344 Lengede
5345 Baddeckenstedt
5346 Liebenburg
5347 Burgdorf (bei Salzgitter)
535
5351 Helmstedt
5352 Schöningen
5353 Königslutter
5354 Jerxheim
5355 Frellstedt
5356 Helmstedt-Barmke
5357 Grasleben
5358 Bahrdorf-Mackendorf
536
5361 Wolfsburg
5362 Wolfsburg-Fallersleben
5363 Wolfsburg-Vorsfelde
5364 Velpke
5365 Wolfsburg-Neindorf
5366 Jembke
5367 Rühen
537
5371 Gifhorn
5372 Meinersen
5373 Hillerse
5374 Isenbüttel
5375 Müden (Aller)
5376 Wesendorf
5378 Sassenburg-Platendorf
5379 Sassenburg-Grussendorf
538
5381 Seesen
5382 Bad Gandersheim
5383 Lutter am Barenberge
5384 Groß Rhüden

54 – Osnabrück and surroundings
540
5401 Georgsmarienhütte
5402 Bissendorf
5403 Bad Iburg
5404 Westerkappeln
5405 Hasbergen (Osnabrück)
5406 Belm
5407 Wallenhorst
5409 Hilter am Teutoburger Wald
541 Osnabrück
542
5421 Dissen am Teutoburger Wald
5422 Melle
5423 Versmold
5424 Bad Rothenfelde, Bad Laer, Hilter
5425 Borgholzhausen
5426 Glandorf
5427 Buer (Stadt Melle)
5428 Neuenkirchen (Stadt Melle)
5429 Wellingholzhausen (Stadt Melle)
543
5432 Löningen
5433 Badbergen
5434 Essen (Oldenburg)
5435 Berge (bei Quakenbrück)
5436 Nortrup
5437 Menslage
5438 Addrup, Gut Lage, Lüsche
5439 Bersenbrück
544
5441 Diepholz
5442 Barnstorf
5443 Lemförde
5444 Wagenfeld
5445 Drebber
5446 Rehden
5447 Lembruch
5448 Barver
545
5451 Ibbenbüren
5452 Mettingen (Westfalen)
5453 Recke
5454 Riesenbeck
5455 Brochterbeck
5456 Velpe
5457 Schale
5458 Hopsten
5459 Hörstel
546
5461 Bramsche
5462 Ankum
5464 Alfhausen
5465 Neuenkirchen (bei Bramsche)
5466 Merzen
5468 Engter
547
5471 Bohmte
5472 Bad Essen
5473 Ostercappeln
5474 Stemwede-Dielingen (Gemeinde Stemwede)
5475 Hunteburg
5476 Venne
548
5481 Lengerich (Westfalen)
5482 Tecklenburg
5483 Lienen
5484 Kattenvenne
5485 Ladbergen
549
5491 Damme (Dümmer)
5492 Steinfeld (Oldenburg)
5493 Neuenkirchen (Old.)
5494 Holdorf (Nieders.)
5495 Vörden

55 – Göttingen and surroundings
550
5502 Dransfeld
5503 Nörten-Hardenberg
5504 Friedland (bei Göttingen)
5505 Hardegsen
5506 Adelebsen
5507 Ebergötzen
5508 Rittmarshausen
5509 Rosdorf
551 Göttingen
552
5520 Braunlage
5521 Herzberg am Harz
5522 Osterode (Harz)
5523 Bad Sachsa
5524 Bad Lauterberg (Harz)
5525 Walkenried
5527 Duderstadt
5528 Gieboldehausen
5529 Rhumspringe
553
5531 Holzminden
5532 Stadtoldendorf
5533 Bodenwerder
5534 Eschershausen (an der Lenne) (Niedersachsen)
5535 Polle
5536 Neuhaus (bei Holzminden)
554
5541 Hann. Münden
5542 Witzenhausen
5543 Staufenberg (Niedersachsen)
5544 Reinhardshagen
5545 Hedemünden
5546 Scheden
555
5551 Northeim
5552 Katlenburg
5553 Kalefeld
5554 Moringen
5555 Fredelsloh
5556 Lindau (Harz)
556
5561 Einbeck
5562 Markoldendorf
5563 Kreiensen
5564 Dassel
5565 Wenzen
557
5571 Uslar
5572 Bodenfelde
5573 Volpriehausen
5574 Oberweser
558
5582 Sankt Andreasberg
5583 Hohegeiß
5584 Hattorf
5585 Sieber
559
5592 Gleichen-Bremke
5593 Lenglern (bei Bovenden)
5594 Reyershausen

56 – Kassel and surroundings
560
5601 Schauenburg
5602 Hessisch Lichtenau and Eschenstruth
5603 Gudensberg
5604 Großalmerode
5605 Kaufungen
5606 Zierenberg
5607 Fuldatal
5608 Söhrewald
5609 Ahnatal
561 Kassel
562
5621 Bad Wildungen
5622 Fritzlar
5623 Edertal
5624 Emstal
5625 Naumburg (Hessen)
5626 Zwesten
563
5631 Korbach
5632 Willingen (Upland)
5633 Diemelsee
5634 Waldeck
5635 Voehl
5636 Lichtenfels-Goddelsheim
564
5641 Warburg
5642 Scherfede
5643 Borgentreich
5644 Peckelsheim
5645 Borgholz (bei Borgentreich)
5646 Willebadessen
5647 Kleinenberg
5648 Gehrden
565
5650 Cornberg
5651 Eschwege
5652 Bad Sooden-Allendorf
5653 Sontra
5654 Herleshausen
5655 Wanfried
5656 Waldkappel
5657 Meißner
5658 Wehretal
5659 Ringgau
566
5661 Melsungen
5662 Felsberg (Hessen)
5663 Spangenberg
5664 Morschen
5665 Guxhagen
567
5671 Hofgeismar
5672 Bad Karlshafen
5673 Immenhausen (Hessen)
5674 Grebenstein
5675 Trendelburg
5676 Liebenau (Hessen)
5677 Calden-Westuffeln
568
5681 Homberg (Efze)
5682 Borken (Hessen)
5683 Wabern (Hessen)
5684 Frielendorf
5685 Knüllwald
5686 Schwarzenborn
569
5691 Bad Arolsen
5692 Wolfhagen
5693 Volkmarsen
5694 Diemelstadt
5695 Twistetal
5696 Landau (bei Arolsen)

57 – Minden and surroundings
570
5702 Lahde (Stadt Petershagen)
5703 Hille
5704 Friedewalde (Stadt Petershagen)
5705 Windheim (Stadt Petershagen)
5706 Porta Westfalica
5707 Petershagen
571 Minden
572
5721 Stadthagen
5722 Bückeburg
5723 Bad Nenndorf
5724 Obernkirchen
5725 Lindhorst (bei Stadthagen)
5726 Wiedensahl
573
5731 Bad Oeynhausen
5732 Löhne
5733 Vlotho
5734 Bergkirchen (Westfalen) (Stadt Bad Oeynhausen)
574
5741 Lübbecke
5742 Preußisch Oldendorf
5743 Gestringen (Stadt Espelkamp)
5744 Hüllhorst
5745 Levern (Gemeinde Stemwede)
5746 Rödinghausen
575
5751 Rinteln
5752 Hattendorf
5753 Bernsen
5754 Bremke (Gemeinde Extertal)
5755 Varenholz (Gemeinde Kalletal)
576
5761 Stolzenau
5764 Steyerberg
5765 Raddestorf
5766 Loccum
5767 Warmsen
5768 Heimsen (Stadt Petershagen)
5769 Voigtei
577
5771 Rahden (Westfalen)
5772 Espelkamp
5773 Wehdem (Gemeinde Stemwede)
5774 Ströhen
5775 Diepenau
5776 Preußisch Ströhen (Stadt Rahden)
5777 Essern

58 – Uelzen and surroundings
580
5802 Wrestedt
5803 Rosche
5804 Rätzlingen
5805 Oetzen
5806 Barum
5807 Altenmedingen
581 Uelzen
582
5820 Suhlendorf
5821 Bad Bevensen
5822 Ebstorf
5823 Bienenbüttel
5824 Bad Bodenteich
5825 Wieren
5826 Suderburg
5827 Unterlüß
5828 Himbergen
5829 Wriedel
583
5831 Wittingen
5832 Hankensbüttel
5833 Brome
5834 Knesebeck
5835 Wahrenholz
5836 Radenbeck
5837 Sprakensehl
5838 Groß Oesingen
5839 Ohrdorf
584
5840 Schnackenburg
5841 Lüchow
5842 Schnega
5843 Wustrow (Wendland)
5844 Clenze
5845 Bergen an der Dumme
5846 Gartow
5848 Trebel
5849 Waddeweitz
585
5850 Neetze
5851 Dahlenburg
5852 Bleckede
5853 Neu Darchau
5854 Barskamp
5855 Nahrendorf
5857 Brackede
5858 Wietzetze
5859 Thomasburg
586
5861 Dannenberg (Elbe)
5862 Hitzacker
5863 Zernien
5864 Jameln
5865 Gusborn
587
5872 Stötze
5874 Soltendieck
5875 Emmendorf
588
5882 Gorleben
5883 Lemgow

59 – Lingen (Ems) and surroundings
590
5901 Fürstenau
5902 Freren
5903 Emsbüren
5904 Lengerich (Emsland)
5905 Beesten
5906 Lünne
5907 Geeste
5908 Lohne (Kreis Nordhorn)
5909 Wettrup
591 Lingen (Ems)
592
5921 Nordhorn
5922 Bad Bentheim
5923 Schüttorf
5924 Gildehaus
5925 Wietmarschen
5926 Engden
593
5931 Meppen
5932 Haren (Ems)
5933 Lathen
5934 Rütenbrock
5935 Schöninghsdorf
5936 Twist
5937 Groß Hesepe
5939 Sustrum
594
5941 Neuenhaus (Dinkel)
5942 Uelsen
5943 Emlichheim
5944 Hoogstede
5946 Georgsdorf
5947 Laar (Vechte)
5948 Itterbeck
595
5951 Werlte
5952 Sögel
5954 Lorup
5955 Esterwegen
5956 Rastdorf
5957 Lindern (Old.)
596
5961 Haselünne
5962 Herzlake
5963 Bawinkel
5964 Lähden
5965 Klein Berßen
5966 Apeldorn
597
5971 Rheine
5973 Neuenkirchen (Kreis Steinfurt)
5975 Mesum
5976 Salzbergen
5977 Spelle
5978 Dreierwalde

6

60 – Northern and eastern surrounding of Frankfurt am Main
600
6002 Ober-Mörlen
6003 Rosbach v.d. Höhe
6004 Lich-Eberstadt
6007 Rosbach-Rodheim, Friedrichsdorf-Burgholzhausen
6008 Echzell
602
6020 Heigenbrücken
6021 Aschaffenburg
6022 Obernburg
6023 Alzenau
6024 Schöllkrippen, Kahlgrund
6026 Großostheim
6027 Stockstadt, Kleinostheim
6028 Niedernberg, Sulzbach
6029 Mömbris, Johannesberg
603
6031 Friedberg (Hessen)
6032 Bad Nauheim
6033 Butzbach
6034 Wöllstadt, Niddatal, Karben-Burg-Gräfenrode
6035 Florstadt, Reichelsheim (Wetterau)
6036 Wölfersheim
6039 Karben
604
6041 Glauburg
6042 Büdingen
6043 Nidda
6044 Schotten
6045 Gedern
6046 Ortenberg
6047 Altenstadt (Hessen)
6048 Büdingen-Eckartshausen
6049 Kefenrod
605
6050 Biebergemünd
6051 Gelnhausen, Linsengericht
6052 Bad Orb
6053 Wächtersbach
6054 Birstein, Brachttal
6055 Freigericht, Hasselroth
6056 Bad Soden-Salmünster
6057 Flörsbachtal
6058 Gründau
6059 Jossgrund
606
6061 Michelstadt
6062 Erbach (Odenwald)
6063 Bad König
6066 Michelstadt-Vielbrunn
6068 Beerfelden
607
6071 Dieburg
6073 Babenhausen
6074 Rödermark, Dietzenbach
6078 Groß-Umstadt
608
6081 Usingen, Neu-Anspach, Wehrheim
6082 Niederreifenberg
6083 Weilrod
6084 Schmitten
6085 Waldsolms
6086 Grävenwiesbach
6087 Waldems
609
6092 Heimbuchenthal
6093 Laufach
6094 Weibersbrunn
6095 Bessenbach
6096 Wiesen (Unterfranken)

61 – Rhine-Main Area, Southern Hesse
610
6101 Bad Vilbel, Niederdorfelden, Frankfurt-Nieder-Erlenbach, Frankfurt-Harheim
6102 Neu-Isenburg
6103 Langen, Egelsbach
6104 Heusenstamm, Obertshausen
6105 Mörfelden-Walldorf
6106 Rodgau, Heusenstamm
6107 Kelsterbach
6108 Mühlheim am Main
6109 Frankfurt-Bergen-Enkheim
611 Wiesbaden
612
6120 Aarbergen, Hohenstein
6122 Hofheim-Wallau
6123 Eltville, Walluf
6124 Bad Schwalbach
6126 Idstein
6127 Niedernhausen
6128 Taunusstein
6129 Schlangenbad
613
6130 Schwabenheim an der Selz
6131 Mainz
6132 Ingelheim am Rhein
6133 Nierstein, Oppenheim
6134 Mainz-Kastel
6135 Bodenheim
6136 Nieder-Olm
6138 Mommenheim
6139 Budenheim
614
6142 Rüsselsheim, Raunheim
6144 Bischofsheim (Mainspitze)
6145 Flörsheim am Main
6146 Hochheim am Main
6147 Trebur
615
6150 Weiterstadt, Erzhausen, Darmstadt-Wixhausen
6151 Darmstadt
6152 Groß-Gerau, Büttelborn
6154 Ober-Ramstadt
6155 Griesheim
6157 Pfungstadt
6158 Riedstadt
6159 Messel
616
6161 Brensbach
6162 Groß-Bieberau, Reinheim
6163 Höchst im Odenwald
6164 Reichelsheim (Odenwald)
6165 Breuberg
6166 Fischbachtal
6167 Modautal
617
6171 Oberursel
6172 Bad Homburg
6173 Kronberg im Taunus
6174 Königstein im Taunus
6175 Friedrichsdorf (Taunus)
618
6181 Hanau
6182 Seligenstadt
6183 Erlensee
6184 Langenselbold, Rodenbach (bei Hanau)
6185 Hammersbach (Hessen)
6186 Großkrotzenburg
6187 Nidderau, Schöneck (Hessen)
6188 Kahl am Main, Karlstein am Main
619
6190 Hattersheim am Main
6192 Hofheim am Taunus, Kriftel
6195 Kelkheim
6196 Bad Soden am Taunus, Eschborn, Liederbach am Taunus, Schwalbach am Taunus, Sulzbach
6198 Eppstein

62 – Rhine-Neckar
620
6201 Birkenau, Gorxheimertal, Hemsbach, Hirschberg an der Bergstraße, Laudenbach, Weinheim
6202 Brühl, Ketsch, Oftersheim, Plankstadt, Schwetzingen
6203 Edingen-Neckarhausen, Heddesheim, Ladenburg, Schriesheim
6204 Viernheim
6205 Altlußheim, Hockenheim, Neulußheim, Reilingen
6206 Bürstadt, Lampertheim
6207 Wald-Michelbach
6209 Mörlenbach
621 Mannheim, Ilvesheim, Neu-Edingen
621 Ludwigshafen am Rhein

622
6220 Heiligkreuzsteinach, Wilhelmsfeld
6221 Heidelberg, Dossenheim, Eppelheim
6222 Dielheim, Mühlhausen, Rauenberg, Wiesloch
6223 Bammental, Gaiberg, Neckargemünd, Wiesenbach
6224 Leimen, Nußloch, Sandhausen
6226 Eschelbronn, Lobbach, Mauer, Meckesheim, Spechbach, Zuzenhausen
6227 St. Leon-Rot, Walldorf
6228 Schönau
6229 Neckarsteinach
623
6231 Hochdorf-Assenheim
6232 Speyer
6233 Frankenthal
6234 Mutterstadt
6235 Schifferstadt
6236 Limburgerhof, Neuhofen
6237 Ludwigshafen-Ruchheim, Maxdorf
6238 Gerolsheim
6239 Bobenheim-Roxheim
624
6241 Worms
6242 Worms-Abenheim
6243 Monsheim
6244 Gundersheim
6245 Biblis
6246 Eich (Rheinhessen), Hamm am Rhein, Ibersheim
6247 Worms-Pfeddersheim
625
6251 Bensheim
6252 Heppenheim
6253 Fürth
6254 Lautertal
6255 Lindenfels
6256 Lampertheim-Hüttenfeld
6257 Seeheim-Jugenheim
6258 Gernsheim
626
6261 Elztal, Mosbach, Neckarzimmern, Obrigheim
6262 Aglasterhausen, Neunkirchen, Reichartshausen, Schönbrunn, Schwarzach
6263 Neckargerach, Binau
6264 Neudenau
6265 Billigheim
6266 Haßmersheim
6267 Fahrenbach
6268 Hüffenhardt
627
6271 Eberbach
6272 Hirschhorn (Neckar)
6274 Waldbrunn
6275 Rothenberg
6276 Hesseneck
628
6281 Buchen (Odenwald)
6282 Walldürn
6283 Hardheim, Höpfingen
6284 Mudau
6285 Walldürn-Altheim
6286 Walldürn-Rippberg
6287 Limbach
629
6291 Adelsheim, Osterburken
6292 Seckach
6293 Schefflenz
6295 Rosenberg
6297 Ravenstein
6298 Möckmühl

63 – Palatine
630
6301 Otterbach
6302 Winnweiler
6303 Enkenbach-Alsenborn, Mehlingen
6307 Geiselberg, Krickenbach, Linden, Schmalenberg, Schopp
631 Kaiserslautern
632
6321 Neustadt an der Weinstraße
6322 Bad Dürkheim
6323 Edenkoben, Edesheim, Flemlingen, Großfischlingen, Hainfeld (Pfalz), Rhodt unter Rietburg, Roschbach, Sankt Martin (Pfalz), Venningen, Weyher in der Pfalz
6327 Lachen-Speyerdorf
6331 Höheischweiler, Pirmasens
6333 Clausen, Donsieders, Heltersberg, Hermersberg, Höheinöd, Horbach, Steinalben, Waldfischbach-Burgalben, Weselberg
6334 Höhfröschen, Maßweiler, Petersberg, Thaleischweiler-Fröschen
6336 Nünschweiler, Rieschweiler-Mühlbach
634
6340 Dierbach, Freckenfeld, Kapsweyer, Niederotterbach, Steinfeld (Pfalz), Vollmersweiler, Wörth-Schaidt
6341 Landau in der Pfalz
6342 Schweigen-Rechtenbach
6343 Bad Bergzabern
6344 Schwegenheim
6345 Albersweiler
6346 Annweiler am Trifels
6347 Hochstadt (Pfalz)
6348 Offenbach an der Queich
6349 Billigheim-Ingenheim
635
6351 Eisenberg, Göllheim
6352 Kirchheimbolanden
6353 Freinsheim, Weisenheim am Sand, Dackenheim, Bobenheim am Berg, Erpolzheim, Herxheim am Berg, Weisenheim am Berg
6359 Grünstadt
637
6371 Landstuhl, Obernheim-Kirchenarnbach
6372 Bruchmühlbach-Miesau
6373 Waldmohr, Schönenberg-Kübelberg
6374 Weilerbach
6375 Biedershausen, Herschberg, Hettenhausen, Knopp-Labach, Reifenberg, Saalstadt, Schauerberg, Schmitshausen, Wallhalben
6385 Reichenbach-Steegen, Albersbach

64 – Central Hesse
640
6400 Mücke
6401 Grünberg
6403 Langgöns, Linden
6404 Fernwald, Lich
6405 Laubach
6406 Lollar, Staufenberg
6407 Rabenau
6408 Buseck, Reiskirchen
6409 Biebertal
641 Gießen, Heuchelheim (Hessen)
642
6420 Lahntal (partially)
6421 Marburg, Weimar (Lahn) (partially), Cölbe (partially)
6422 Kirchhain, Amöneburg
6423 Wetter, Lahntal (partially), Münchhausen (partially)
6424 Ebsdorfergrund
6425 Rauschenberg
6426 Weimar (Lahn) (partially), Fronhausen
6427 Cölbe (partially)
6428 Stadtallendorf (partially)
6429 Stadtallendorf (partially)
643
6431 Limburg an der Lahn and Parts of Runkel
6432 Diez
6433 Hadamar
6434 Bad Camberg
6435 Wallmerod
6436 Dornburg (Hessen)
6438 Hünfelden
6439 Holzappel
644
6441 Wetzlar
6442 Braunfels
6443 Ehringshausen
6444 Bischoffen
6445 Schöffengrund
6446 Hohenahr
6447 Langgöns-Niederkleen
6449 Ehringshausen-Katzenfurt
645
6451 Frankenberg (Eder)
6452 Battenberg
6454 Wohratal
6457 Burgwald, Münchhausen (partially)
646
6461 Biedenkopf
6462 Gladenbach, Lohra
6464 Angelburg, Steffenberg
6465 Breidenbach
6466 Dautphetal (partially)
6467 Hatzfeld (Eder)
6468 Dautphetal (partially)
647
6471 Weilburg an der Lahn
6472 Weilmünster
6473 Leun
6474 Villmar
6476 Mengerskirchen
6477 Greifenstein-Nenderoth
6478 Greifenstein-Ulm
6479 Waldbrunn (Westerwald)
648
6482 Runkel
6483 Selters (Taunus)
6484 Beselich
6485 Nentershausen
6486 Katzenelnbogen

65 – Moselle, Eifel, Hunsrück
650
6501 Konz
6502 Schweich
651 Trier
653
6531 Bernkastel-Kues
6533 Morbach
6535 Maring-Noviand, Osann-Monzel
654
6541 Traben-Trarbach
6544 Rhaunen
655
6551 Prüm
656
6561 Bitburg
657
6571 Wittlich
658
6581 Saarburg
6588 Pluwig
659
6591 Gerolstein
6592 Daun

66 – Greater Fulda, Eastern Hesse
661 Fulda, Künzell, Petersberg
662
6622 Bebra
6627 Nentershausen
664
6641 Lauterbach (Hessen)
6642 Schlitz
6643 Herbstein, Lautertal
6644 Grebenhain
6645 Ulrichstein
6647 Herbstein-Stockhausen
6648 Bad Salzschlirf, Großenlüder
665
6656 Ebersburg
6657 Hofbieber
6658 Poppenhausen (Wasserkuppe)
666
6661 Schlüchtern
669
6691 Schwalmstadt
6692 Neustadt
6693 Neuental
6694 Neukirchen
6695 Jesberg
6696 Gilserberg
6697 Willingshausen
6698 Alsfeld

67 – Rhenish Hesse, Eastern Hunsrück
671 Bad Kreuznach
672
6721 Bingen
6722 Rüdesheim, Geisenheim, Johannisberg, Marienthal, Stephanshausen, Aulhausen, Assmannshausen
6723 Oestrich-Winkel, Mittelheim
6724 Stromberg Hunsrück
6725 Gau-Algesheim
6726 Lorch (Rheingau)
6727 Gensingen
6728 Ober-Hilbersheim
673
6731 Alzey
6732 Udenheim
6733 Gau-Odernheim
674
6741 Sankt Goar
6744 Oberwesel
6746 Pfalzfeld
6747 Emmelshausen
675
6751 Bad Sobernheim
6752 Kirn
6753 Odenbach, Meisenheim
6754 Martinstein
6755 Odernheim am Glan
6756 Winterbach (Soonwald)
6757 Becherbach bei Kirn
6758 Waldböckelheim
676
6761 Simmern (Hunsrück)
677
6771 Sankt Goarshausen
678
6781 Idar-Oberstein
6783 Baumholder
6784 Idar-Oberstein (East)

68 – Saarland
681 Saarbrücken
682
6821 Neunkirchen (Saar)
6824 Ottweiler
6825 Illingen (Saar)
6826 Bexbach
683
6831 Saarlouis, Dillingen
6832 Beckingen-Reimsbach
6833 Rehlingen-Siersburg
6834 Wadgassen
6835 Beckingen
6836 Überherrn
6837 Wallerfangen
6838 Saarwellingen
684
6841 Homburg (Saar)
6842 Blieskastel
6849 Kirkel
685
6851 St. Wendel
6853 Marpingen
6855 Freisen
6857 Namborn
686
6861 Merzig
6864 Mettlach
687
6871 Wadern
6872 Losheim am See
6876 Weiskirchen
688
6881 Lebach, Eppelborn
6887 Schmelz (Saar)
689
6894 St. Ingbert
6897 Dudweiler, Sulzbach
6898 Völklingen

69 – Frankfurt am Main, Offenbach am Main
69 Frankfurt am Main, Offenbach am Main

7

70x/071 – Stuttgart and surroundings
700 personal numbers
701 personal numbers, reserved
702
7021 Kirchheim unter Teck, Dettingen unter Teck, Notzingen, Owen, Schlierbach
7022 Nürtingen, Frickenhausen, Großbettlingen, Oberboihingen, Unterensingen, Wolfschlugen
7023 Weilheim an der Teck, Bissingen an der Teck, Holzmaden, Neidlingen, Ohmden
7024 Wendlingen am Neckar, Köngen
7025 Neuffen, Beuren, Frickenhausen-Linsenhofen, Kohlberg
7026 Lenningen, Erkenbrechtsweiler
703
7031 Böblingen, Altdorf, Holzgerlingen, Schönaich, Sindelfingen
7032 Herrenberg, Ammerbuch, Gäufelden, Jettingen, Nufringen
7033 Weil der Stadt, Grafenau, Heimsheim, Ostelsheim, Simmozheim
7034 Ehningen, Aidlingen, Gärtringen, Hildrizhausen
704
7041 Mühlacker, Ötisheim, Wiernsheim
7042 Vaihingen an der Enz, Eberdingen, Illingen, Mühlacker, Oberriexingen, Sersheim
7043 Maulbronn, Illingen, Knittlingen, Ölbronn-Dürrn, Sternenfels
7044 Mönsheim, Friolzheim, Heimsheim, Weissach, Wiernsheim, Wimsheim, Wurmberg
7045 Oberderdingen, Sternenfels
7046 Zaberfeld, Pfaffenhofen, Sachsenheim
705
7051 Calw, Althengstett, Bad Teinach-Zavelstein, Oberreichenbach
7052 Bad Liebenzell
7053 Bad Teinach-Zavelstein, Calw, Neubulach, Oberreichenbach
7054 Wildberg, Ebhausen
7055 Neuweiler, Bad Wildbad, Neubulach
7056 Gechingen, Aidlingen, Deckenpfronn, Wildberg
706
7062 Beilstein, Abstatt, Ilsfeld, Neckarwestheim, Oberstenfeld
7063 Bad Wimpfen
7066 Bad Rappenau, Heilbronn
707
7071 Tübingen, Kusterdingen
7072 Gomaringen, Dußlingen, Kusterdingen-Immenhausen, Reutlingen-Bronnweiler, Reutlingen-Gönningen
7073 Ammerbuch, Rottenburg am Neckar, Tübingen-Unterjesingen
708
7081 Bad Wildbad, Dobel, Höfen an der Enz
7082 Neuenbürg, Birkenfeld, Engelsbrand, Keltern, Straubenhardt
7083 Bad Herrenalb, Dobel, Loffenau
7084 Schömberg im Schwarzwald, Bad Liebenzell, Oberreichenbach
7085 Enzklösterle, Bad Wildbad
709 (not assigned)
710 (not assigned)
711 Stuttgart, Aichwald, Denkendorf, Esslingen am Neckar, Fellbach, Filderstadt-Bernhausen, Filderstadt-Bonlanden, Filderstadt-Plattenhardt, Korntal, Leinfelden-Echterdingen, Ostfildern-Kemnat, Ostfildern-Nellingen, Ostfildern-Ruit
712
7121 Reutlingen, Eningen unter Achalm, Kirchentellinsfurt, Pfullingen, Wannweil
7122 St. Johann, Lichtenstein
7123 Metzingen, Bempflingen, Dettingen an der Erms, Frickenhausen-Tischardt, Grafenberg, Neuffen-Kappishäusern, Riederich
7124 Trochtelfingen, Burladingen-Hörschwag, Gammertingen
7125 Bad Urach, Hülben
7126 Burladingen-Melchingen, Burladingen-Salmendingen, Burladingen-Stetten
7127 Neckartenzlingen, Aichtal, Altdorf, Altenriet, Neckartailfingen, Pliezhausen, Reutlingen-Mittelstadt, Schlaitdorf, Walddorfhäslach
7128 Sonnenbühl
7129 Lichtenstein, Engstingen
713
7130 Löwenstein, Beilstein, Obersulm, Untergruppenbach, Wüstenrot
7131 Heilbronn, Flein, Leingarten, Untergruppenbach
7132 Neckarsulm, Erlenbach, Oedheim, Untereisesheim
7133 Lauffen am Neckar, Ilsfeld, Neckarwestheim, Nordheim, Talheim
7134 Weinsberg, Eberstadt, Ellhofen, Lehrensteinsfeld, Obersulm
7135 Brackenheim, Cleebronn, Güglingen, Nordheim
7136 Bad Friedrichshall, Gundelsheim, Oedheim, Offenau
7138 Schwaigern, Eppingen, Massenbachhausen
7139 Hardthausen am Kocher, Langenbrettach, Neuenstadt am Kocher, Oedheim
714
7141 Ludwigsburg, Asperg, Freiberg am Neckar, Kornwestheim, Möglingen, Remseck am Neckar, Tamm
7142 Bietigheim-Bissingen, Ingersheim
7143 Besigheim, Bönnigheim, Erligheim, Freudental, Gemmrigheim, Hessigheim, Kirchheim am Neckar, Löchgau, Mundelsheim, Walheim
7144 Marbach am Neckar, Affalterbach, Benningen am Neckar, Erdmannhausen, Kirchberg an der Murr, Ludwigsburg, Murr, Pleidelsheim, Steinheim an der Murr
7145 Markgröningen
7146 Remseck am Neckar, Waiblingen
7147 Sachsenheim, Bietigheim-Bissingen, Markgröningen
7148 Großbottwar, Aspach, Steinheim an der Murr
715
7150 Münchingen, Hemmingen, Schwieberdingen
7151 Waiblingen, Kernen im Remstal, Korb, Remshalden, Weinstadt
7152 Leonberg, Ditzingen, Rutesheim
7153 Plochingen, Altbach, Baltmannsweiler, Deizisau, Hochdorf, Lichtenwald, Reichenbach an der Fils, Wernau
7154 Kornwestheim
7156 Ditzingen, Gerlingen
7157 Waldenbuch, Dettenhausen, Steinenbronn, Weil im Schönbuch
7158 Neuhausen auf den Fildern, Filderstadt-Harthausen, Filderstadt-Sielmingen, Ostfildern-Scharnhausen
7159 Renningen, Magstadt
716
7161 Göppingen, Albershausen, Birenbach, Börtlingen, Eislingen/Fils, Eschenbach, Heiningen, Rechberghausen, Schlat, Uhingen, Wangen
7162 Süßen, Donzdorf, Gingen an der Fils, Salach, Waldstetten
7163 Ebersbach an der Fils, Uhingen
7164 Boll, Aichelberg, Dürnau, Gammelshausen, Hattenhofen, Zell unter Aichelberg
7165 Göppingen-Hohenstaufen, Eislingen/Fils, Göppingen-Hohrein, Ottenbach
7166 Adelberg
717
7171 Schwäbisch Gmünd, Alfdorf-Adelstetten, Mutlangen, Waldstetten
7172 Lorch, Adelberg, Alfdorf, Börtlingen, Wäschenbeuren
7173 Heubach, Bartholomä, Böbingen an der Rems, Schwäbisch Gmünd-Bargau
7174 Mögglingen, Heuchlingen
7175 Leinzell, Eschach, Göggingen, Iggingen, Schechingen, Täferrot
7176 Spraitbach, Alfdorf, Durlangen, Ruppertshofen, Täferrot
718
7181 Schorndorf, Berglen, Plüderhausen, Remshalden, Urbach, Winterbach
7182 Welzheim, Alfdorf, Kaisersbach, Plüderhausen
7183 Rudersberg, Althütte
7184 Kaisersbach, Murrhardt
719
7191 Backnang, Allmersbach im Tal, Aspach, Auenwald, Burgstetten, Oppenweiler, Weissach im Tal
7192 Murrhardt, Althütte, Auenwald, Großerlach
7193 Sulzbach an der Murr, Großerlach, Oppenweiler
7194 Spiegelberg, Oberstenfeld, Wüstenrot
7195 Winnenden, Berglen, Leutenbach, Schwaikheim

72 – Karlsruhe and surroundings
720
7202 Karlsbad
7203 Walzbachtal
7204 Malsch-Völkersbach, Gaggenau, Malsch
721 Karlsruhe, Eggenstein-Leopoldshafen, Pfinztal-Berghausen (Baden), Rheinstetten, Stutensee,
722
7220 Forbach, Ottersweier
7221 Baden-Baden, Sinzheim
7222 Rastatt, Bischweier, Gaggenau, Kuppenheim, Muggensturm, Ötigheim, Steinmauern
7223 Bühl, Baden-Baden, Bühlertal, Ottersweier, Sinzheim
7224 Gernsbach, Gaggenau, Weisenbach
7225 Gaggenau, Kuppenheim
7226 Bühl, Bühlertal, Forbach, Ottersweier, Sasbach
7227 Lichtenau (Baden), Bühl, Rheinau, Rheinmünster
7228 Forbach
7229 Iffezheim, Hügelsheim, Rastatt
723
7231 Pforzheim, Birkenfeld, Ispringen, Kämpfelbach, Kieselbronn
7232 Königsbach-Stein, Eisingen, Kämpfelbach, Remchingen
7233 Niefern-Öschelbronn
7234 Tiefenbronn, Neuhausen, Pforzheim
7235 Unterreichenbach, Engelsbrand, Schömberg im Schwarzwald
7236 Keltern
7237 Neulingen, Ölbronn-Dürrn
724
7240 Pfinztal nur Söllingen, Kleinsteinbach and Wöschbach
7242 Rheinstetten
7243 Ettlingen, Waldbronn
7244 Weingarten (Baden), Stutensee
7245 Durmersheim, Au am Rhein, Bietigheim, Elchesheim-Illingen
7246 Malsch
7247 Linkenheim-Hochstetten, Dettenheim, Eggenstein-Leopoldshafen
7248 Marxzell, Karlsbad-Ittersbach, Straubenhardt
7249 Stutensee
725
7250 Kraichtal
7251 Bruchsal, Forst, Karlsdorf-Neuthard, Kraichtal, Ubstadt-Weiher
7252 Bretten, Gondelsheim
7253 Bad Schönborn, Kronau, Malsch, Mühlhausen, Östringen, Rauenberg, Ubstadt-Weiher
7254 Waghäusel, Oberhausen-Rheinhausen
7255 Graben-Neudorf, Dettenheim, Hambrücken
7256 Philippsburg
7257 Bruchsal-Untergrombach, Bruchsal
7258 Oberderdingen-Flehingen, Bretten, Kraichtal, Kürnbach, Oberderdingen, Zaisenhausen
7259 Östringen-Odenheim, Kraichtal, Östringen
726
7260 Eppingen, Sinsheim
7261 Sinsheim, Waibstadt
7262 Eppingen
7263 Waibstadt, Epfenbach, Helmstadt-Bargen, Neckarbischofsheim, Neidenstein
7264 Bad Rappenau, Siegelsbach
7265 Angelbachtal, Sinsheim
7266 Kirchardt, Bad Rappenau, Ittlingen, Sinsheim
7267 Gemmingen
7268 Bad Rappenau, Neckarbischofsheim, Sinsheim
7269 Sulzfeld
727
7271 Wörth am Rhein, Jockgrim
7272 Rülzheim, Bellheim, Hördt, Kuhardt, Leimersheim, Neupotz, Rheinzabern
7273 Hagenbach, Berg, Neuburg am Rhein
7274 Germersheim
7275 Kandel, Erlenbach bei Kandel, Hatzenbühl, Minfeld
7276 Herxheim bei Landau/Pfalz, Herxheimweyher
7277 Wörth-Büchelberg, Scheibenhardt, Wörth am Rhein
728 (not assigned)
729 (not assigned)

73 – Ulm and surroundings
730
7300 Roggenburg (Bayern)
7302 Pfaffenhofen an der Roth, Holzheim
7303 Illertissen
7304 Blaustein, Dornstadt, Ulm
7305 Erbach, Hüttisheim, Oberdischingen, Ulm
7306 Vöhringen, Bellenberg, Illerrieden, Weißenhorn
7307 Senden, Neu-Ulm, Vöhringen
7308 Nersingen, Elchingen, Neu-Ulm
7309 Weißenhorn, Senden
731 Ulm, Blaustein, Elchingen, Neu-Ulm
732
7321 Heidenheim an der Brenz, Nattheim
7322 Giengen an der Brenz, Hermaringen
7323 Gerstetten, Amstetten-Bräunisheim, Steinheim-Söhnstetten
7324 Herbrechtingen, Gerstetten-Dettingen, Giengen-Hürben, Niederstotzingen-Lontal
7325 Sontheim an der Brenz, Bächingen an der Brenz, Niederstotzingen
7326 Neresheim, Dischingen-Frickingen, Nattheim-Auernheim
7327 Dischingen, Nattheim-Fleinheim
7328 Königsbronn
7329 Steinheim am Albuch
733
7331 Geislingen an der Steige, Amstetten, Bad Überkingen, Kuchen
7332 Lauterstein, Böhmenkirch, Schwäbisch Gmünd-Degenfeld
7333 Laichingen, Westerheim
7334 Deggingen, Bad Ditzenbach, Bad Überkingen-Hausen, Bad Überkingen-Unterböhringen, Geislingen an der Steige-Aufhausen
7335 Wiesensteig, Bad Ditzenbach-Gosbach, Drackenstein, Gruibingen, Hohenstadt, Mühlhausen im Täle
7336 Lonsee, Amstetten – Hofstett-Emerbuch, Amstetten – Reutti, Dornstadt-Scharenstetten, Westerstetten-Hinterdenkental
7337 Nellingen, Geislingen an der Steige-Aufhausen (Wannenhöfe), Merklingen
734
7340 Neenstetten, Altheim (Alb), Ballendorf, Börslingen, Breitingen, Holzkirch, Weidenstetten
7343 Buch, Unterroth
7344 Blaubeuren, Berghülen, Erbach
7345 Langenau, Asselfingen, Nerenstetten, Öllingen, Rammingen, Setzingen
7346 Illerkirchberg, Schnürpflingen, Staig, Ulm
7347 Dietenheim, Balzheim, Schwendi
7348 Beimerstetten, Bernstadt, Dornstadt, Langenau, Ulm, Westerstetten
735
7351 Biberach an der Riß, Maselheim, Mittelbiberach, Ummendorf, Warthausen
7352 Ochsenhausen, Biberach an der Riß, Erlenmoos, Gutenzell-Hürbel, Maselheim, Steinhausen an der Rottum
7353 Schwendi, Gutenzell-Hürbel, Maselheim, Mietingen, Wain
7354 Erolzheim, Berkheim, Dettingen an der Iller, Gutenzell-Hürbel, Kirchberg an der Iller, Kirchdorf an der Iller
7355 Hochdorf, Eberhardzell, Ingoldingen, Ummendorf
7356 Schemmerhofen, Maselheim, Mietingen, Warthausen
7357 Attenweiler, Biberach an der Riß, Grundsheim, Oberstadion, Oggelshausen, Schemmerhofen, Uttenweiler, Warthausen
7358 Eberhardzell, Bad Wurzach, Ochsenhausen, Rot an der Rot, Steinhausen an der Rottum
736
7361 Aalen, Hüttlingen, Rainau
7362 Bopfingen, Kirchheim am Ries, Neresheim, Riesbürg
7363 Lauchheim, Westhausen
7364 Oberkochen
7365 Essingen
7366 Abtsgmünd, Aalen-Dewangen, Aalen-Fachsenfeld, Hüttlingen, Neuler, Schechingen-Leinweiler
7367 Aalen-Ebnat, Aalen-Waldhausen, Heidenheim-Großkuchen, Neresheim-Elchingen
737
7371 Riedlingen, Altheim (bei Riedlingen), Betzenweiler, Dürmentingen, Ertingen, Langenenslingen, Unlingen
7373 Zwiefalten, Emeringen, Pfronstetten, Riedlingen
7374 Uttenweiler, Alleshausen, Betzenweiler, Emerkingen, Seekirch, Unlingen
7375 Obermarchtal, Ehingen (Donau), Lauterach, Rechtenstein
7376 Langenenslingen
738
7381 Münsingen, Bad Urach, Gutsbezirk Münsingen, Mehrstetten
7382 Römerstein, Grabenstetten
7383 Münsingen-Buttenhausen, Hayingen, Hohenstein
7384 Allmendingen, Ehingen (Donau), Münsingen, Schelklingen
7385 Gomadingen, Engstingen
7386 Hayingen, Ehingen (Donau)
7387 Hohenstein
7388 Pfronstetten, Trochtelfingen
7389 Heroldstatt, Gutsbezirk Münsingen
739
7391 Ehingen (Donau), Allmendingen, Altheim (bei Ehingen), Griesingen, Öpfingen
7392 Laupheim, Achstetten, Burgrieden, Ehingen (Donau), Mietingen
7393 Munderkingen, Ehingen (Donau), Emerkingen, Hausen am Bussen, Oberstadion, Rottenacker, Untermarchtal, Unterstadion, Unterwachingen
7394 Schelklingen, Allmendingen, Blaubeuren, Erbach
7395 Ehingen-Dächingen, Ehingen (Donau)

74 – Rottweil and surroundings
740
7402 Fluorn-Winzeln, Dunningen, Schramberg
7403 Dunningen, Eschbronn, Zimmern ob Rottweil
7404 Epfendorf, Bösingen, Dietingen
741 Rottweil, Deißlingen, Dietingen, Villingendorf, Zimmern ob Rottweil
742
7420 Deißlingen
7422 Schramberg, Aichhalden, Hardt, Lauterbach
7423 Oberndorf am Neckar, Dornhan
7424 Spaichingen, Aldingen, Balgheim, Denkingen, Dürbheim, Gunningen, Hausen ob Verena, Rietheim-Weilheim
7425 Trossingen, Deißlingen, Villingen-Schwenningen
7426 Gosheim, Deilingen, Frittlingen, Wehingen, Wellendingen
7427 Schömberg (bei Balingen), Dautmergen, Dietingen, Dormettingen, Dotternhausen, Ratshausen, Rosenfeld, Rottweil, Weilen unter den Rinnen, Zimmern unter der Burg
7428 Rosenfeld, Dietingen, Geislingen
7429 Egesheim, Böttingen, Bubsheim, Königsheim, Mahlstetten, Nusplingen, Reichenbach am Heuberg, Renquishausen
743
7431 Albstadt, Bitz, Meßstetten
7432 Albstadt
7433 Balingen, Geislingen
7434 Winterlingen, Straßberg
7435 Albstadt, Balingen
7436 Hausen am Tann, Meßstetten, Obernheim
744
7440 Bad Rippoldsau-Schapbach
7441 Freudenstadt
7442 Baiersbronn, Freudenstadt
7443 Dornstetten, Freudenstadt, Glatten, Schopfloch, Waldachtal
7444 Alpirsbach, Aichhalden, Loßburg
7445 Pfalzgrafenweiler, Waldachtal
7446 Loßburg
7447 Baiersbronn-Schwarzenberg, Baiersbronn, Seewald
7448 Seewald
7449 Baiersbronn-Obertal, Baiersbronn
745
7451 Horb am Neckar
7452 Nagold, Jettingen, Mötzingen, Rohrdorf
7453 Altensteig, Egenhausen, Grömbach, Simmersfeld, Wörnersberg
7454 Sulz am Neckar, Vöhringen
7455 Dornhan, Betzweiler-Wälde
7456 Haiterbach
7457 Rottenburg-Ergenzingen, Bondorf, Eutingen im Gäu, Neustetten, Rottenburg am Neckar, Starzach
7458 Ebhausen, Altensteig
7459 Nagold-Hochdorf, Eutingen im Gäu, Nagold
746
7461 Tuttlingen, Rietheim-Weilheim, Wurmlingen
7462 Immendingen, Tuttlingen
7463 Mühlheim an der Donau, Fridingen an der Donau, Kolbingen
7464 Talheim, Tuttlingen, Durchhausen, Seitingen-Oberflacht, Tuningen, Tuttlingen
7465 Emmingen-Liptingen, Eigeltingen
7466 Beuron, Bärenthal, Irndorf, Leibertingen
7467 Neuhausen ob Eck
747
7471 Hechingen, Bisingen, Bodelshausen, Rangendingen
7472 Rottenburg am Neckar, Neustetten, Starzach, Tübingen
7473 Mössingen, Nehren, Ofterdingen
7474 Haigerloch
7475 Burladingen
7476 Bisingen, Grosselfingen
7477 Jungingen, Burladingen, Hechingen
7478 Hirrlingen, Rangendingen, Rottenburg am Neckar, Starzach
748
7482 Horb-Dettingen, Sulz am Neckar
7483 Empfingen, Eutingen im Gäu, Horb am Neckar, Starzach
7484 Simmersfeld
7485 Empfingen
7486 Horb am Neckar, Waldachtal
749 (not assigned)

75 – Oberschwaben
750
7502 Wolpertswende, Baindt, Fronreute
7503 Wilhelmsdorf, Guggenhausen, Horgenzell
7504 Horgenzell, Berg (Schussental), Ravensburg, Wilhelmsdorf
7505 Fronreute, Berg (Schussental), Fleischwangen, Guggenhausen, Unterwaldhausen, Wilhelmsdorf
7506 Wangen, Amtzell, Kißlegg, Vogt
751 Ravensburg, Baienfurt, Baindt, Berg (Schussental), Grünkraut, Schlier, Weingarten (Württemberg)
752
7520 Bodnegg, Amtzell, Grünkraut, Ravensburg
7522 Wangen im Allgäu, Amtzell, Argenbühl, Hergatz, Kißlegg
7524 Bad Waldsee, Bad Wurzach, Eberhardzell
7525 Aulendorf, Altshausen, Bad Schussenried, Bad Waldsee, Ebersbach-Musbach, Wolpertswende
7527 Wolfegg, Bad Wurzach, Bergatreute, Vogt im Allgäu
7528 Neukirch, Amtzell, Tettnang, Wangen im Allgäu
7529 Waldburg, Amtzell, Schlier, Vogt im Allgäu, Wangen im Allgäu
753
7531 Konstanz, Reichenau
7532 Meersburg, Daisendorf, Hagnau am Bodensee, Immenstaad am Bodensee, Stetten
7533 Allensbach, Konstanz-OT: Dettingen-Wallhausen, Dingelsdorf
7534 Reichenau
754
7541 Friedrichshafen, Eriskirch
7542 Tettnang, Meckenbeuren
7543 Kressbronn, Langenargen
7544 Markdorf, Bermatingen, Friedrichshafen-OT: Kluftern
7545 Immenstaad
7546 Oberteuringen
755
7551 Überlingen, Owingen, Sipplingen
7552 Pfullendorf, Heiligenberg, Herdwangen-Schönach, Ostrach
7553 Salem, Deggenhausertal, Überlingen
7554 Heiligenberg, Frickingen, Salem, Überlingen
7555 Deggenhausertal, Illmensee, Salem
7556 Uhldingen-Mühlhofen, Salem
7557 Herdwangen-Schönach, Hohenfels, Owingen
7558 Illmensee, Ostrach, Pfullendorf
756
7561 Leutkirch im Allgäu, Aichstetten, Bad Wurzach
7562 Isny im Allgäu, Argenbühl, Maierhöfen
7563 Kißlegg, Argenbühl, Leutkirch im Allgäu
7564 Bad Wurzach, Leutkirch im Allgäu
7565 Aichstetten, Aitrach, Bad Wurzach, Leutkirch im Allgäu
7566 Argenbühl, Heimenkirch, Isny im Allgäu, Leutkirch im Allgäu
7567 Leutkirch, Argenbühl, Isny im Allgäu
7568 Bad Wurzach-Hauerz, Aitrach, Bad Wurzach, Rot an der Rot, Steinhausen an der Rottum
7569 Isny im Allgäu-Eisenbach, Buchenberg, Isny im Allgäu
757
7570 Sigmaringen-Gutenstein, Beuron, Leibertingen, Meßkirch, Sigmaringen
7571 Sigmaringen, Bingen, Inzigkofen, Sigmaringendorf, Stetten am kalten Markt
7572 Mengen, Altheim bei Riedlingen, Hohentengen, Scheer, Sigmaringendorf
7573 Stetten am kalten Markt, Sigmaringen
7574 Gammertingen, Hettingen, Langenenslingen, Neufra
7575 Meßkirch, Inzigkofen, Leibertingen, Sauldorf
7576 Krauchenwies, Mengen
7577 Veringenstadt, Hettingen, Sigmaringen, Winterlingen
7578 Wald, Meßkirch, Sauldorf
7579 Schwenningen, Beuron, Meßstetten
758
7581 Bad Saulgau, Boms, Ebersbach-Musbach, Eichstegen
7582 Bad Buchau, Alleshausen, Allmannsweiler, Biberach an der Riß, Dürnau, Kanzach, Moosburg, Oggelshausen, Seekirch, Tiefenbach
7583 Bad Schussenried, Ebersbach-Musbach, Ingoldingen, Bad Saulgau
7584 Altshausen, Boms, Ebenweiler, Ebersbach-Musbach, Eichstegen, Fronreute, Guggenhausen
7585 Ostrach, Hohentengen
7586 Herbertingen, Ertingen, Hohentengen
7587 Hoßkirch, Guggenhausen, Königseggwald, Ostrach, Riedhausen, Unterwaldhausen
759 (not assigned)

76 – Freiburg and surroundings
760
7602 Oberried, Bollschweil, Münstertal/Schwarzwald
761 Freiburg im Breisgau, Au, Gundelfingen, Horben, Kirchzarten, Merzhausen, Sölden, Wittnau
762
7620 Schopfheim
7621 Lörrach, Binzen, Eimeldingen, Inzlingen, Rümmingen, Schallbach, Weil am Rhein, Wittlingen
7622 Schopfheim, Hausen im Wiesental, Maulburg, Rheinfelden-Nordschwaben, Wieslet
7623 Rheinfelden (Baden), Schwörstadt
7624 Grenzach-Wyhlen
7625 Zell im Wiesental, Häg-Ehrsberg
7626 Kandern, Malsburg-Marzell, Schliengen
7627 Steinen, Rheinfeden-Adelhausen
7628 Efringen-Kirchen, Fischingen
7629 Tegernau, Bürchau, Elbenschwand, Raich, Sallneck, Steinen-Endenburg, Wies
763
7631 Müllheim, Auggen, Buggingen, Neuenburg
7632 Badenweiler
7633 Staufen im Breisgau, Bad Krozingen, Bollschweil, Ehrenkirchen, Hartheim, Heitersheim
7634 Sulzburg, Ballrechten-Dottingen, Buggingen, Eschbach, Heitersheim, Neuenburg am Rhein
7635 Schliengen, Bad Bellingen, Neuenburg am Rhein
7636 Münstertal/Schwarzwald, Staufen im Breisgau
764
7641 Emmendingen, Freiamt, Reute, Sexau, Teningen
7642 Endingen am Kaiserstuhl, Forchheim, Riegel am Kaiserstuhl, Sasbach am Kaiserstuhl, Wyhl am Kaiserstuhl
7643 Herbolzheim, Rheinhausen
7644 Kenzingen, Malterdingen
7645 Freiamt, Gutach im Breisgau, Sexau
7646 Weisweil
765
7651 Titisee-Neustadt, Breitnau, Friedenweiler
7652 Breitnau, Hinterzarten, Titisee-Neustadt
7653 Lenzkirch, Bonndorf im Schwarzwald
7654 Löffingen, Bräunlingen-Unterbrend, Friedenweiler
7655 Feldberg, Baden-Württemberg
7656 Schluchsee
7657 Eisenbach (Hochschwarzwald), Titisee-Neustadt, Vöhrenbach
766
7660 St. Peter, Simonswald, Stegen
7661 Kirchzarten, Buchenbach, Oberried, Stegen
7662 Vogtsburg im Kaiserstuhl, Sasbach am Kaiserstuhl
7663 Eichstetten am Kaiserstuhl, Bahlingen am Kaiserstuhl, Bötzingen, Teningen
7664 Freiburg-Tiengen, Breisach-Rimsingen, Ebringen, Ehrenkirchen, Freiburg-Munzingen, Pfaffenweiler, Schallstadt
7665 March, Gottenheim, Umkirch, Freiburg-Hochdorf
7666 Denzlingen, Heuweiler, Vörstetten
7667 Breisach am Rhein
7668 Ihringen, Breisach am Rhein, Merdingen
7669 St. Märgen, Titisee-Neustadt-Waldau
767
7671 Todtnau
7672 St. Blasien, Dachsberg, Häusern, Höchenschwand, Ibach
7673 Schönau im Schwarzwald, Aitern, Böllen, Fröhnd, Neuenweg, Schönenberg, Tunau, Utzenfeld, Wembach, Wieden
7674 Todtmoos, Todtnau
7675 Bernau, St. Blasien
7676 Feldberg, Baden-Württemberg, Todtnau
768
7681 Waldkirch, Gutach im Breisgau
7682 Elzach, Biederbach, Winden im Elztal
7683 Simonswald
7684 Glottertal
7685 Gutach im Breisgau, Winden im Elztal
769 (not assigned)

77 – Südschwarzwald
770
7702 Blumberg
7703 Bonndorf im Schwarzwald, Stühlingen
7704 Geisingen
7705 Bräunlingen-Mistelbrunn, Donaueschingen-OT: Hubertshofen, Wolterdingen; Villingen-Schwenningen-Tannheim
7706 Bad Dürrheim-OT: Biesingen, Sunthausen, Oberbaldingen, Unterbaldingen, Öfingen, Immendingen
7707 Bräunlingen-Döggingen, Hüfingen-Hausen vor Wald, -Mundelfingen, Löffingen
7708 Geisingen
7709 Wutach, Stühlingen
771 Donaueschingen, Bräunlingen, Hüfingen
772
7720 Villingen-Schwenningen-OT: Schwenningen, Mühlhausen; Dauchingen
7721 Villingen-Schwenningen-OT: Villingen, Pfaffenweiler, Obereschach, Herzogenweiler, Weilersbach; Brigachtal, Mönchweiler, Unterkirnach
7722 Triberg im Schwarzwald, Furtwangen, Hornberg, Schonach im Schwarzwald, Schönwald im Schwarzwald
7723 Furtwangen, Gütenbach
7724 St. Georgen im Schwarzwald, Unterkirnach
7725 Königsfeld im Schwarzwald, Hardt, Mönchweiler, Niedereschach, St. Georgen im Schwarzwald, Unterkirnach, Villingen-Schwenningen
7726 Bad Dürrheim, Brigachtal
7727 Vöhrenbach, Unterkirnach, Villingen-Schwenningen
7728 Niedereschach, Dauchingen, Villingen-Schwenningen
7729 Schramberg: OT Tennenbronn
773
7731 Singen, Gottmadingen, Hilzingen, Mühlhausen-Ehingen, Rielasingen-Worblingen
7732 Radolfzell am Bodensee, Gaienhofen, Moos
7733 Engen, Immendingen, Mühlhausen-Ehingen, Tengen
7734 Gailingen am Hochrhein, Büsingen am Hochrhein, Gottmadingen
7735 Öhningen, Gaienhofen
7736 Tengen, Blumberg
7738 Steißlingen, Radolfzell am Bodensee, Singen
7739 Hilzingen, Gottmadingen
774
7741 Waldshut-Tiengen-OT: Tiengen, Aichen Gutenburg, Breitenfeld, Detzeln, Gurtweil, Indlekofen, Krenkingen, Oberalpfen; Küssaberg, Lauchringen, Ühlingen-Birkendorf, Weilheim
7742 Klettgau, Dettighofen, Hohentengen am Hochrhein, Küssaberg, Lauchringen
7743 Ühlingen-Birkendorf, Grafenhausen, Stühlingen, Waldshut-Tiengen
7744 Stühlingen
7745 Jestetten, Dettighofen, Lottstetten
7746 Eggingen, Wutöschingen
7747 Grafenhausen, Schluchsee, Ühlingen-Birkendorf, Waldshut-Tiengen, Weilheim
7748 Grafenhausen
775
7751 Waldshut-Tiengen, Dogern
7753 Albbruck, Laufenburg (Baden)
7754 Görwihl, Albbruck
7755 Weilheim (Baden), Albbruck, Dachsberg (Südschwarzwald), Höchenschwand, St. Blasien, Waldshut-Tiengen
776
7761 Bad Säckingen, Rickenbach (Hotzenwald), Wehr (Baden)
7762 Wehr (Baden), Hasel, Schwörstadt
7763 Murg, Bad Säckingen, Laufenburg (Baden)
7764 Herrischried, Görwihl
7765 Rickenbach
777
7771 Stockach, Bodman-Ludwigshafen, Eigeltingen, Hohenfels, Orsingen-Nenzingen
7773 Bodman-Ludwigshafen, Stockach, Überlingen
7774 Eigeltingen, Aach, Orsingen-Nenzingen, Volkertshausen
7775 Mühlingen, Eigeltingen, Hohenfels, Stockach
7777 Sauldorf, Buchheim, Leibertingen, Neuhausen ob Eck
778 (not assigned)
779 (not assigned)

78 – Offenburg and Nordschwarzwald
780
7802 Oberkirch, Lautenbach
7803 Gengenbach, Berghaupten, Ohlsbach
7804 Oppenau
7805 Appenweier, Oberkirch-Nußbach, -Zusenhofen
7806 Bad Peterstal-Griesbach, Oppenau
7807 Neuried (Rhein)
7808 Hohberg, Friesenheim-Oberschopfheim, Neuried-Schutterzell
781 Offenburg, Durbach, Ortenberg, Schutterwald
782
7821 Lahr/Schwarzwald, Friesenheim
7822 Ettenheim, Kappel-Grafenhausen, Mahlberg-Orschweier, Ringsheim, Rust
7823 Seelbach, Schuttertal
7824 Schwanau, Meißenheim
7825 Kippenheim, Lahr/Schwarzwald, Mahlberg
7826 Schuttertal, Biederbach, Ettenheim, Hofstetten
783
7831 Hausach, Gutach (Schwarzwaldbahn)
7832 Haslach im Kinzigtal, Fischerbach, Hofstetten, Mühlenbach, Steinach
7833 Hornberg, Gutach (Schwarzwaldbahn)
7834 Wolfach, Hausach, Oberwolfach, Schiltach
7835 Zell am Harmersbach, Biberach (Baden)
7836 Schiltach, Schenkenzell, Wolfach
7837 Oberharmersbach, Zell am Harmersbach
7838 Nordrach
7839 Schapbach, Oberwolfach
784
7841 Achern, Lauf, Sasbach, Sasbachwalden
7842 Kappelrodeck, Ottenhöfen im Schwarzwald, Seebach
7843 Renchen, Achern-Wagshurst
7844 Rheinau, Renchen
785
7851 Kehl
7852 Willstätt, Kehl-Odelshofen
7853 Kehl-Bodersweier, -Querbach, -Zierolshofen, -Leutesheim, Rheinau-Linx
7854 Kehl-Goldscheuer, -Marlen, -Kittersburg, -Hohnhurst, Willstätt-Eckartsweier
786 (not assigned)
787 (not assigned)
788 (not assigned)
789 (not assigned)

79 – Schwäbisch Hall and surroundings
790
7903 Mainhardt, Großerlach, Michelfeld, Wüstenrot
7904 Ilshofen, Braunsbach, Crailsheim, Kirchberg an der Jagst, Langenburg, Schwäbisch Hall, Vellberg, Wolpertshausen
7905 Langenburg, Braunsbach, Gerabronn, Ilshofen, Künzelsau
7906 Braunsbach, Ilshofen, Langenburg, Schwäbisch Hall, Untermünkheim, Wolpertshausen
7907 Schwäbisch Hall-Sulzdorf, Ilshofen, Schwäbisch Hall, Vellberg, Wolpertshausen
791 Schwäbisch Hall, Braunsbach, Michelbach an der Bilz, Michelfeld, Rosengarten, Untermünkheim
792 (not assigned)
793
7930 Boxberg, Ahorn, Bad Mergentheim
7931 Bad Mergentheim, Boxberg, Dörzbach, Igersheim, Mulfingen, Niederstetten
7932 Niederstetten, Bad Mergentheim, Creglingen, Schrozberg, Weikersheim
7933 Creglingen, Niederstetten, Schrozberg
7934 Weikersheim, Niederstetten
7935 Schrozberg, Niederstetten
7936 Schrozberg-Bartenstein, Blaufelden, Mulfingen, Schrozberg
7937 Dörzbach, Bad Mergentheim, Krautheim, Mulfingen
7938 Mulfingen, Bad Mergentheim, Dörzbach, Ingelfingen, Schrozberg
7939 Schrozberg-Spielbach, Creglingen, Niederstetten, Schrozberg
794
7940 Künzelsau, Ingelfingen, Kupferzell, Langenburg, Niedernhall
7941 Öhringen, Neuenstein, Pfedelbach, Zweiflingen
7942 Neuenstein, Öhringen, Waldenburg
7943 Forchtenberg, Jagsthausen, Schöntal, Widdern
7944 Kupferzell, Künzelsau, Untermünkheim
7945 Wüstenrot, Bretzfeld, Mainhardt
7946 Bretzfeld, Langenbrettach, Obersulm, Pfedelbach, Wüstenrot
7947 Forchtenberg, Öhringen, Schöntal, Weißbach, Zweiflingen
7948 Öhringen-Ohrnberg, Forchtenberg, Öhringen, Zweiflingen
7949 Pfedelbach-Untersteinbach, Bretzfeld, Michelfeld, Öhringen, Pfedelbach, Waldenburg
795
7950 Schnelldorf, Feuchtwangen, Kreßberg, Satteldorf, Wörnitz
7951 Crailsheim, Ilshofen, Kirchberg an der Jagst, Kreßberg, Satteldorf
7952 Gerabronn, Blaufelden, Langenburg, Rot am See
7953 Blaufelden, Gerabronn, Rot am See, Schrozberg
7954 Kirchberg an der Jagst, Crailsheim, Ilshofen, Rot am See
7955 Wallhausen, Rot am See, Satteldorf
7957 Kreßberg, Crailsheim, Schnelldorf, Stimpfach
7958 Rot am See-Brettheim, Blaufelden, Gerabronn, Kirchberg an der Jagst, Rot am See, Wallhausen
7959 Frankenhardt, Jagstzell, Rosenberg
796
7961 Ellwangen (Jagst), Ellenberg, Hüttlingen, Jagstzell, Neuler, Rainau, Stödtlen, Unterschneidheim
7962 Fichtenau, Ellenberg, Jagstzell, Stimpfach, Wört
7963 Adelmannsfelden, Abtsgmünd, Bühlerzell, Neuler, Rosenberg
7964 Stödtlen, Ellenberg, Ellwangen (Jagst), Tannhausen, Wört
7965 Ellwangen-Röhlingen, Ellenberg, Ellwangen (Jagst), Rainau, Westhausen
7966 Unterschneidheim, Ellwangen (Jagst), Tannhausen
7967 Jagstzell, Ellwangen (Jagst), Fichtenau, Frankenhardt, Rosenberg, Stimpfach
797
7971 Gaildorf, Fichtenberg
7972 Gschwend, Alfdorf, Fichtenberg
7973 Obersontheim, Bühlertann
7974 Bühlerzell, Adelmannsfelden, Bühlertann
7975 Abtsgmünd-Untergröningen, Abtsgmünd, Adelmannsfelden, Obergröningen
7976 Sulzbach-Laufen, Abtsgmünd
7977 Oberrot, Fichtenberg, Schwäbisch Hall
798 (not assigned)
799 (not assigned)

8

80
800 toll-free numbers (Freecall)
801 toll-free numbers, reserved
802
8021 Waakirchen
8022 Tegernsee
8023 Bayrischzell
8024 Holzkirchen
8025 Miesbach
8026 Hausham
8027 Dietramszell
8028 Fischbachau
8029 Kreuth bei Tegernsee
803
8031 Rosenheim
8032 Rohrdorf
8033 Oberaudorf
8034 Brannenburg
8035 Raubling
8036 Stephanskirchen Simssee
8038 Vogtareuth
8039 Rott a.Inn
804
8041 Bad Tölz
8042 Lenggries
8043 Jachenau
8045 Lenggries-Fall
8046 Bad Heilbrunn
805
8051 Prien a.Chiemsee
8052 Aschau i.Chiemgau
8053 Bad Endorf
8054 Breitbrunn a.Chiemsee
8055 Halfing
8056 Eggstätt
8057 Aschau-Sachrang
806
8061 Bad Aibling
8062 Bruckmühl and Vagen
8063 Feldkirchen-Westerham
8064 Au bei Bad Aibling
8065 Tuntenhausen-Schönau
8066 Bad Feilnbach
8067 Tuntenhausen
807
8071 Wasserburg am Inn
8072 Haag in Oberbayern
8073 Gars am Inn
8074 Schnaitsee
8075 Amerang
8076 Pfaffing
808
8081 Dorfen
8082 Schwindegg
8083 Isen
8084 Taufkirchen Vils
8085 Sankt Wolfgang Kr. Erding
8086 Buchbach
809
8091 Kirchseon
8092 Grafing bei München
8093 Glonn i. Kreis Ebersberg
8094 Steinhöring
8095 Aying

81
810
8102 Höhenkirchen-Siegertsbrunn
8104 Sauerlach
8105 Gilching
8106 Vaterstetten (former 08169)
811 Hallbergmoos
812
8121 Markt Schwaben
8122 Erding
8123 Moosinning
8124 Forstern in Oberbayern
813
8131 Dachau
8133 Haimhausen
8134 Odelzhausen
8135 Sulzemoos
8136 Markt Indersdorf
8137 Petershausen
8138 Schwabhausen bei Dachau
814
8141 Fürstenfeldbruck
8142 Olching
8143 Inning am Ammersee
8144 Grafrath
8145 Mammendorf
8146 Moorenweis
815
8151 Starnberg, Berg am Starnberger See
8152 Herrsching am Ammersee, Seefeld
8153 Weßling
8157 Feldafing
8158 Tutzing
816
8161 Freising
8165 Neufahrn bei Freising
8166 Allershausen
8167 Zolling
8168 Attenkirchen
8169 former area Code of Hallbergmoos (now 0811 since End of 1988)
817
8170 Straßlach-Dingharting
8171 Wolfratshausen
8176 Egling bei Wolfratshausen
8177 Münsing
8178 Icking
8179 Eurasburg an der Loisach

82 – Augsburg and surroundings
820
8206 Prittriching
821 Augsburg
822
8221 Günzburg
8222 Burgau
8223 Ichenhausen
8224 Offingen
8225 Jettingen-Scheppach
8226 Bibertal
8230 Gablingen
823
8231 Königsbrunn
8232 Schwabmünchen
8233 Kissing
8234 Bobingen
8236 Fischach
8237 Aindling
8238 Gessertshausen
8239 Langenneufnach
824
8241 Buchloe
8243 Fuchstal
8245 Türkheim
8246 Waal
8247 Bad Wörishofen
8248 Lamerdingen
8249 Ettringen
825
8250 Hilgertshausen-Tandern
8251 Aichach
8252 Schrobenhausen
8253 Pöttmes
8254 Altomünster
8257 Inchenhofen
8258 Sielenbach
8259 Schiltberg
826
8261 Mindelheim
8262 Mittelneufnach
8263 Breitenbrunn
8265 Pfaffenhausen
8266 Kirchheim in Schwaben
8267 Dirlewang
8268 Tussenhausen
8269 Unteregg
827
8271 Meitingen, Thierhaupten
8272 Wertingen
8273 Nordendorf
8274 Buttenwiesen
8276 Baar, Thierhaupten
828
8281 Thannhausen
8282 Krumbach
8283 Neuburg an der Kammel
8284 Ziemetshausen
8285 Burtenbach
829
8291 Zusmarshausen
8292 Dinkelscherben
8293 Welden
8294 Horgau
8295 Altenmünster
8296 Villenbach

83
830 --
8302 Görisried
8303 Waltenhofen
8304 Wildpoldsried
8306 Ronsberg
831 Kempten Allgäu
832 --
8320 Missen-Wilhams
8321 Sonthofen
8322 Oberstdorf
8323 Immenstadt i.Allgäu
8324 Bad Hindelang
8325 Oberstaufen-Thalkirchdorf
8326 Fischen im Allgäu
8327 Rettenberg
8328 Balderschwang
8329 former area code of Kleinwalsertal, an Austrian exclave in Germany, now accessible through Austria country code +43 5517
833 --
8330 Legau
8331 Memmingen
8332 Ottobeuren
8333 Babenhausen (Schwab)
8334 Bad Grönenbach
8335 Fellheim
8336 Erkheim
8337 Altenstadt (Iller)
8338 Böhen
834 --
8340 Baisweil
8341 Kaufbeuren
8342 Marktoberdorf
8343 Aitrang
8344 Westendorf b.Kaufb
8345 Stöttwang
8346 Pforzen
8347 Friesenried
8348 Bidingen
8349 Stötten a.Auerberg
836 --
8361 Nesselwang
8362 Füssen
8363 Pfronten
8364 Seeg
8365 Wertach
8365 8 former area code of Jungholz, an Austrian exclave in Germany, now accessible through Austria country code +43 5676
8366 Oy-Mittelberg
8367 Roßhaupten (Forggensee)
8368 Halblech
8369 Rückholz
837—Area of Kempten
8370 Wiggensbach
8372 Günzach
8373 Altusried
8374 Dietmannsried
8375 Weitnau
8376 Sulzberg (Allgäu)
8377 Unterthingau
8378 Buchenberg b. Kempten
8379 Waltenhofen-Martinszell-Oberdorf
838 --
8380 Lindau-Achberg
8381 Lindenberg im Allgäu
8382 Lindau
8383 Grünenbach (Allgäu)
8384 Röthenbach (Allgäu)
8385 Hergatz
8386 Oberstaufen
8387 Weiler-Simmerberg
8388 Hergesnweiler
8389 Weißensberg
839 --
8392 Markt Rettenbach
8393 Holzgünz
8394 Lautrach
8395 Tannheim (Württ.)

84
840
8402 Münchsmünster
8403 Pförring
8404 Oberdolling
8405 Stammham b.Ingolstadt
8406 Böhmfeld
8407 Grossmehring
841 Ingolstadt
842
8421 Eichstätt
8422 Dollnstein
8423 Titting
8424 Nassenfels
8426 Walting Kr. Eichstätt
8427 Wellheim
843
8431 Neuburg a.d.Donau
8432 Burgheim
8433 Königsmoos
8434 Rennertshofen
844
8441 Pfaffenhofen a.d.Ilm
8442 Wolnzach
8443 Hohenwart Paar
8444 Schweitenkirchen
8445 Gerolsbach
8446 Pörnbach
845
8450 Ingolstadt-Zuchering
8452 Geisenfeld
8453 Reichertshofen Oberbay.
8454 Karlshuld
8456 Lenting
8457 Vohburg a.d.Donau
8458 Gaimersheim
8459 Manching
846
8460 Berching-Holnstein
8461 Beilngries
8462 Berching
8463 Greding
8464 Dietfurt a.d.Altmühl
8465 Kipfenberg
8466 Denkendorf Oberbay.
8467 Kinding
8468 Altmannstein-Pondorf
8469 Freystadt-Burggriesbach

85
850
8501 Thyrnau
8502 Fürstenzell
8503 Neuhaus am Inn
8504 Tittling
8505 Hutthurm
8506 Bad Höhenstadt
8507 Neuburg am Inn
8509 Ruderting
851 Passau
853
8531 Pocking
8532 Bad Griesbach im Rottal
8533 Rotthalmünster
8534 Tettenweis
8535 Haarbach
8536 Kößlarn
8537 Bad Füssing-Aigen
8538 Pocking-Hartkirchen
854
8541 Vilshofen Niederbay.
8542 Ortenburg
8543 Aidenbach
8544 Eging am See
8545 Hofkirchen (Bavaria)
8546 Windorf-Otterskirchen
8547 Osterhofen-Gergweis
8548 Vilshofen-Sandbach
8549 Vilshofen-Pleinting
855
8550 Philippsreut
8551 Freyung
8552 Grafenau Niederbay.
8553 Spiegelau
8554 Schönberg (Niederbayern)
8555 Perlesreut
8556 Haidmühle
8557 Mauth
8558 Hohenau (Niederbayern)
856
8561 Pfarrkirchen Niederbay.
8562 Triftern
8563 Bad Birnbach Rottal
8564 Johanniskirchen
8565 Dietersburg-Baumgarten
857
8571 Simbach am Inn
8572 Tann Niederbay.
8573 Ering
8574 Wittibreut
858
8581 Waldkirchen Niederbay.
8582 Röhrnbach
8583 Neureichenau
8584 Breitenberg (Niederbayern)
8585 Grainet
8586 Hauzenberg
859
8591 Obernzell
8592 Wegscheid Niederbay.
8593 Untergriesbach

86
861 Traunstein
862
8621 Trostberg
8622 Tacherting
8623 Kirchweidach
8624 Obing
8628 Kienberg
8629 Palling
863
8630 Kraiburg
8631 Mühldorf
8633 Tüßling/Polling
8634 Garching
8636 Ampfing
8638 Waldkraiburg
864
8640	Reit im Winkl
8641	Grassau
8642	Übersee
8649	Schleching
865
8650 Marktschellenberg
8651 Bad Reichenhall
8652 Berchtesgaden
8654 Freilassing
8656 Anger
8657 Ramsau
866
8661 Grabenstätt
8662 Siegsdorf
8663 Ruhpolding
8664 Chieming
8665 Inzell
8666 Teisendorf
8667 Seebruck
8669 Traunreut
867
8670 Reischach
8677 Burghausen
8679 Burgkirchen an der Alz
868
8682 Laufen (Salzach)

87
870
8705 Altfraunhofen
871 Landshut
872
8722 Gangkofen
873
8731 Dingolfing
8732 Frontenhausen
874
8741 Vilsbiburg
8743 Geisenhausen
8745 Bodenkirchen
875
876
8761 Moosburg an der Isar
8765 Tondorf
878
8781 Rottenburg an der Laaber
879

88
880
8801 Seeshaupt
8802 Huglfing
8803 Peißenberg
8805 Hohenpeißenberg
8806 Utting am Ammersee
8807 Dießen am Ammersee
8808 Pähl
8809 Wessobrunn
881 Weilheim in Oberbayern
882
8821 Garmisch-Partenkirchen
8822 Oberammergau
8823 Mittenwald
8824 Oberau
8825 Krün
884
8841 Murnau
885
8851 Kochel am See
8856 Penzberg
8857 Benediktbeuern
8858 Walchensee
886
8860 Bernbeuren
8861 Schongau
8862 Steingaden (Obb)
8867 Rottenbuch (Obb)
8868 Schwabsoien
8869 Kinsau

89 – München
89 München

9

Remark
These area codes were changed in February 1997 in order to allow service 0900 numbers:
9002 → 09090 Rain (Lech)
9003 → 09080 Harburg (Schwaben)
9004 → 09070 Tapfheim
9005 → 09084 Bissingen (Schwaben)
9006 → 09078 Mertingen
9007 → 09097 Marxheim
9008 → 09089 Bissingen-Unterringingen
9009 → 09099 Kaisheim

90
900
900-1 premium-rate information services
900-3 premium-rate entertainment services
900-5 premium-rate services (miscellaneous)
900-9 premium-rate dialer
901 premium-rate numbers, reserved
902 replacement for 0137/0138, planned
906 Donauwörth
907
9070 Tapfheim
9071 Dillingen
9072 Lauingen
9073 Gundelfingen
9074 Höchstädt
9075 Glött
9076 Wittislingen
9077 Bachhagel
9078 Mertingen
908
9080 Harburg
9081 Nördlingen
9082 Oettingen
9083 Möttingen
9084 Bissingen
9085 Alerheim
9086 Fremdingen
9087 Marktoffingen
9088 Mönchsdeggingen
9089 Bissingen-Unterringingen
909
9090 Rain
9091 Monheim
9092 Wemding
9093 Polsingen
9094 Tagmersheim
9097 Marxheim
9099 Kaisheim

91
910
9101 Langenzenn
9102 Wilhermsdorf
9103 Cadolzburg
9104 Emskirchen
9105 Großhabersdorf
9106 Markt Erlbach
9107 Trautskirchen
911 Nürnberg/Fürth
912
9122 Schwabach
9123 Lauf an der Pegnitz
9126 Eckental
9127 Roßtal
9128 Feucht
9129 Wendelstein (Mittelfranken)
913
9131 Erlangen
9132 Herzogenaurach
9133 Baiersdorf
9134 Neunkirchen am Brand
9135 Heßdorf
914
9141 Weißenburg in Bayern
9142 Treuchtlingen
9143 Pappenheim
9144 Pleinfeld
9145 Solnhofen
9146 Markt Berolzheim
9147 Nennslingen
9148 Ettenstatt
9149 Weißenburg-Suffersheim
915
9151 Hersbruck
9152 Hartenstein
9153 Schnaittach
9154 Pommelsbrunn
9155 Simmelsdorf
9156 Neuhaus an der Pegnitz
9157 Alfeld (Mittelfranken)
9158 Offenhausen (Mittelfranken)
916
9161 Neustadt an der Aisch
9162 Scheinfeld
9163 Dachsbach
9164 Langenfeld
9165 Sugenheim
9166 Münchsteinach
9167 Oberscheinfeld
917
9170 Schwanstetten
9171 Roth
9172 Georgensgmünd
9173 Thalmässing
9174 Hilpoltstein
9175 Spalt
9176 Allersberg
9177 Heideck
9178 Abenberg
9179 Freystadt
918
9180 Seligenporten bei Pyrbaum (Oberpfalz)
9181 Neumarkt in der Oberpfalz
9182 Velburg
9183 Burgthann
9184 Deining (Oberpfalz)
9185 Mühlhausen (Oberpfalz)
9186 Lauterhofen (Oberpfalz)
9187 Altdorf bei Nürnberg
9188 Postbauer-Heng
9189 Berg bei Neumarkt in der Oberpfalz
919
9191 Forchheim
9192 Gräfenberg
9193 Höchstadt
9194 Ebermannstadt
9195 Adelsdorf
9196 Wiesenttal
9198 Heiligenstadt in Oberfranken

92
920
9201 Gesees
9202 Waischenfeld
9203 Neudrossenfeld
9204 Plankenfels
9205 Vorbach
9206 Obernsees
9207 Königsfeld (Oberfranken)
9208 Bindlach
921 Bayreuth
922
9220 Azendorf
9221 Kulmbach
9222 Presseck
9223 Rugendorf
9224 (not assigned)
9225 Stadtsteinach
9226 (not assigned)
9227 Neuenmarkt
9228 Thurnau
9229 Mainleus
923
9230 (not assigned)
9231 Marktredwitz
9232 Wunsiedel im Fichtelgebirge
9233 Arzberg (Oberfranken)
9234 Neusorg
9235 Thierstein
9236 Nagel
9237 (not assigned)
9238 Röslau
9239 (not assigned)
924
9240 (not assigned)
9241 Pegnitz
9242 Gößweinstein
9243 Pottenstein (Oberfranken)
9244 Betzenstein
9245 Obertrubach
9246 Trockau
9247 (not assigned)
9248 (not assigned)
9249 (not assigned)
925
9250 (not assigned)
9251 Münchberg
9252 Helmbrechts
9253 Weißenstadt
9254 Gefrees
9255 Marktleugast
9256 Stammbach
9257 Zell (Oberfranken)
9258 (not assigned)
9259 (not assigned)
926
9260 Wilhelmsthal (Oberfranken)
9261 Kronach
9262 Wallenfels
9263 Ludwigsstadt
9264 Küps
9265 Pressig
9266 Mitwitz
9267 Nordhalben
9268 Teuschnitz
9269 Tettau (Oberfranken)
927
9270 Creußen
9271 Alladorf
9272 Fichtelberg
9273 Bad Berneck im Fichtelgebirge
9274 Hollfeld
9275 Speichersdorf
9276 Bischofsgrün
9277 Warmensteinach
9278 Weidenberg
9279 Mistelgau
928
9280 Selbitz (Oberfranken)
9281 Hof (Saale)
9282 Naila
9283 Rehau
9284 Schwarzenbach an der Saale
9285 Kirchenlamitz
9286 Oberkotzau
9287 Selb
9288 Bad Steben
9289 Schwarzenbach am Wald
929
9290 (not assigned)
9291 (not assigned)
9292 Konradsreuth
9293 Berg (Oberfranken)
9294 Regnitzlosau
9295 Töpen
9296 (not assigned)
9297 (not assigned)
9298 (not assigned)
9299 (not assigned)

93
930
9301 (not assigned)
9302 Rottendorf (Unterfranken)
9303 Eibelstadt
9304 (not assigned)
9305 Estenfeld
9306 Kist
9307 Altertheim
9308 (not assigned)
9309 (not assigned)
931 Würzburg
932
9321 Kitzingen
9322 (not assigned)
9323 Iphofen
9324 Dettelbach
9325 Kleinlangheim
9326 Markt Einersheim
9327 (not assigned)
9328 (not assigned)
9329 (not assigned)
933
9330 (not assigned)
9331 Ochsenfurt
9332 Marktbreit
9333 Sommerhausen
9334 Giebelstadt
9335 Aub (Kreis Würzburg)
9336 Bütthard
9337 Gaukönigshofen
9338 Röttingen (Unterfranken)
9339 Ippesheim
934
9340 Königheim-Brehmen
9341 Tauberbischofsheim
9342 Wertheim
9343 Lauda-Königshofen
9344 Großrinderfeld-Gerchsheim
9345 Külsheim (Baden)
9346 Grünsfeld
9347 Wittighausen
9348 Werbach-Gamburg
9349 Werbach-Wenkheim
935
9350 Hundsbach (Unterfranken)
9351 Gemünden am Main
9352 Lohr am Main
9353 Karlstadt
9354 Rieneck
9355 Frammersbach
9356 Burgsinn
9357 Gräfendorf (Unterfranken)
9358 Gössenheim
9359 Wiesenfeld (Unterfranken)
936
9360 Thüngen (Bayern)
9361 (not assigned)
9362 (not assigned)
9363 Arnstein (Unterfranken)
9364 Zellingen
9365 Rimpar
9366 Geroldshausen
9367 Unterpleichfeld
9368 (not assigned)
9369 Uettingen
937
9370 (not assigned)
9371 Miltenberg
9372 Klingenberg am Main
9373 Amorbach
9374 Eschau (Unterfranken)
9375 Freudenberg
9376 Collenberg
9377 Freudenberg-Boxtal
9378 Riedern (Unterfranken)
9379 (not assigned)
938
9380 (not assigned)
9381 Volkach
9382 Gerolzhofen
9383 Wiesentheid
9384 Schwanfeld
9385 Kolitzheim
9386 Prosselsheim
9387 (not assigned)
9388 (not assigned)
9389 (not assigned)
939
9390 (not assigned)
9391 Marktheidenfeld
9392 Faulbach (Unterfranken)
9393 Rothenfels (Unterfranken)
9394 Oberndorf bei Marktheidenfeld
9395 Homburg am Main
9396 Urspringen bei Lohr am Main
9397 Wertheim-Dertingen
9398 Birkenfeld bei Würzburg
9399 (not assigned)

94
940
9400 (not assigned)
9401 Neutraubling
9402 Regenstauf
9403 Donaustauf
9404 Nittendorf
9405 Bad Abbach
9406 Mintraching
9407 Wenzenbach
9408 Altenthann
9409 Pielenhofen
941 Regensburg
942
9420 Gundhöring
9421 Straubing
9422 Bogen (Niederbayern)
9423 Geiselhöring
9424 Straßkirchen bei Straubing
9425 (not assigned)
9426 Oberschneiding
9427 Leiblfing
9428 Kirchroth
9429 Rain (Niederbayern)
943
9430 (not assigned)
9431 Schwandorf
9432 (not assigned)
9433 Nabburg
9434 Bodenwöhr
9435 Schwarzenfeld
9436 Nittenau
9437 (not assigned)
9438 Freihöls
9439 Kemnath bei Fuhrn
944
9440 (not assigned)
9441 Kelheim
9442 Riedenburg
9443 Abensberg
9444 Siegenburg
9445 Neustadt an der Donau
9446 Altmannstein
9447 Essing
9448 Herrnwahlthann
9449 (not assigned)
945
9450 (not assigned)
9451 Eggmühl
9452 Langquaid
9453 Thalmassing (Oberpfalz)
9454 Aufhausen (Oberpfalz)
9455 (not assigned)
9456 (not assigned)
9457 (not assigned)
9458 (not assigned)
9459 (not assigned)
946
9460 (not assigned)
9461 Roding
9462 Falkenstein (Oberpfalz)
9463 Wald (Oberpfalz)
9464 Walderbach, Reichenbach
9465 Neukirchen-Balbini
9466 Stamsried
9467 Michelsneukirchen
9468 Zell (Landkreis Cham)
9469 Neubäu (Oberpfalz)
947
9470 (not assigned)
9471 Burglengenfeld
9472 Hohenfels (Oberpfalz)
9473 Kallmünz
9474 Schmidmühlen
9475 (not assigned)
9476 (not assigned)
9477 (not assigned)
9478 (not assigned)
9479 (not assigned)
948
9480 Sünching
9481 Pfatter
9482 Wörth an der Donau
9483 (not assigned)
9484 Brennberg
9485 (not assigned)
9486 (not assigned)
9487 (not assigned)
9488 (not assigned)
9489 (not assigned)
949
9490 (not assigned)
9491 Hemau
9492 Parsberg
9493 Beratzhausen
9494 (not assigned)
9495 Breitenbrunn (Oberpfalz)
9496 (not assigned)
9497 Seubersdorf (Oberpfalz)
9498 Laaber bei Hemau
9499 Painten

95
950
9500 (not assigned)
9501 (not assigned)
9502 Frensdorf
9503 Oberhaid (Oberfranken)
9504 Stadelhofen
9505 Litzendorf
9506 (not assigned)
9507 (not assigned)
9508 (not assigned)
9509 (not assigned)
951 Bamberg
952
9521 Haßfurt
9523 Hofheim in Unterfranken
9524 Zeil am Main and Sand am Main
9525 Königsberg in Bayern
9527 Knetzgau
9528 Donnersdorf
9529 Oberaurach
953
9531 Ebern
9532 Maroldsweisach
9533 Untermerzbach
9534 Burgpreppach
9535 Pfarrweisach
9536 Kirchlauter
954
9542 Schesslitz
9543 Hirschaid
9544 Baunach
9545 Buttenheim
9546 Burgebrach
9547 Zapfendorf
9548 Mühlhausen Mittelfr.
9549 Lisberg
955
9551 Burgwindheim
9552 Burghaslach
9553 Ebrach Oberfr.
9554 Untersteinbach Unterfr.
9555 Schlüsselfeld-Aschbach
9556 Geiselwind
956
9560 Grub a.Forst
9561 Coburg
9562 Sonnefeld
9563 Rödental
9564 Rodach
9565 Untersiemau
9566 Meeder
9567 Sesslach-Gemünda
9568 Neustadt b. Coburg
9569 Sesslach
957
9571 Lichtenfels (Bavaria)
9572 Burgkunstadt
9573 Staffelstein Oberfr.
9574 Marktzeuln
9575 Weismain
9576 Lichtenfels-Isling

96
960
9602 Neustadt an der Waldnaab
9603 Floß
9604 Wernberg-Köblitz
9605 Weiherhammer
9606 Pfreimd
9607 Luhe-Wildenau
9608 Kohlberg
961 Weiden (Oberpfalz)
962
9621 Amberg (Oberpfalz)
9622 Hirschau
9624 Ensdorf (Oberpfalz)
9625 Kastl bei Amberg (Oberpfalz)
9626 Hohenburg
9627 Freudenberg (Oberpfalz)
9628 Ursensollen
963
9631 Tirschenreuth
9632 Waldsassen
9633 Mitterteich
9634 Wiesau
9635 Bärnau
9636 Plößberg
9637 Falkenberg (Oberpfalz)
9638 Bad Neualbenreuth
9639 Mähring
964
9641 Grafenwöhr
9642 Kemnath-Stadt
9643 Auerbach (Oberpfalz)
9644 Pressath
9645 Eschenbach (Oberpfalz)
9646 Freihung
9647 Kirchenthumbach
9648 Neustadt am Kulm
965
9651 Vohenstrauß
9652 Waidhaus
9653 Eslarn
9654 Pleystein
9655 Tännesberg
9656 Moosbach (Oberpfalz)
9657 Waldthurn
9658 Georgenberg (Oberpfalz)
9659 Leuchtenberg
966
9661 Sulzbach-Rosenberg
9662 Vilseck
9663 Neukirchen bei Sulzbach-Rosenberg
9664 Hahnbach
9665 Königstein (Oberpfalz)
9666 Illschwang
967
9671 Oberviechtach
9672 Neunburg vorm Wald
9673 Tiefenbach (Oberpfalz)
9674 Schönsee
9675 Altendorf (Oberpfalz)
9676 Winklarn (Oberpfalz)
9677 Oberviechtach-Pullenried
968
9681 Windischeschenbach
9682 Erbendorf
9683 Friedenfels

97
970
9701 Sandberg Unterfr.
9704 Euerdorf
9708 Bad Bocklet
971 Bad Kissingen
972
9720 Üchtelhausen
9721 Schweinfurt
9722 Werneck
9723 Röthlein
9724 Stadtlauringen
9725 Poppenhausen Unterfr.
9726 Euerbach
9727 Schonungen-Marktsteinach
9728 Wülfershausen Unterfr.
9729 Grettstadt
973
9732 Hammelburg
9733 Münnerstadt
9734 Burkardroth
9735 Massbach
9736 Oberthulba
9737 Wartmannsroth
9738 Rottershausen
974
9741 Bad Brückenau
9742 Kalbach Rhön
9744 Zeitlofs-Detter
9745 Wildflecken
9746 Zeitlofs
9747 Geroda
9748 Motten
9749 Oberbach Unterfr.
976
9761 Bad Königshofen
9762 Saal a.d.Saale
9763 Sulzdorf a.d.Lederhecke
9764 Höchheim
9765 Trappstadt
9766 Grosswenkheim
977
9771 Bad Neustadt
9772 Bischofsheim an der Rhön
9773 Unsleben
9774 Oberelsbach
9775 Schönau an der Brend
9776 Mellrichstadt
9777 Ostheim vor der Rhön
9778 Fladungen
9779 Nordheim vor der Rhön

98
980
9802 Ansbach-Katterbach
9803 Colmberg
9804 Aurach
9805 Burgoberbach
981 Ansbach
982
9820 Lehrberg
9822 Bechhofen a. d. Heide
9823 Leutershausen
9824 Dietenhofen
9825 Herrieden
9826 Weidenbach Mittelfr.
9827 Lichtenau Mittelfr.
9828 Rügland
9829 Flachslanden
983
9831 Gunzenhausen
9832 Wassertrüdingen
9833 Heidenheim Mittelfr.
9834 Theilenhofen
9836 Gunzenhausen-Cronheim
9837 Haundorf
984
9841 Bad Windsheim
9842 Uffenheim
9843 Burgbernheim
9844 Obernzenn
9845 Oberdachstetten
9846 Ipsheim
9847 Ergersheim
9848 Simmershofen
985
9851 Dinkelsbühl
9852 Feuchtwangen
9853 Wilburgstetten
9854 Wittelshofen
9855 Dentlein am Forst
9856 Dürrwangen
9857 Schopfloch Mittelfr.
986
9861 Rothenburg ob der Tauber
9865 Adelshofen
9867 Geslau
9868 Schillingsfürst
9869 Wettringen Mittelfr.
987
9871 Windsbach
9872 Heilsbronn
9873 Abenberg-Wassermungenau
9874 Neuendettelsau
9875 Wolframs-Eschenbach
9876 Rohr Mittelfr.

99
990
9901 Hengersberg
9903 Schöllnach
9904 Lalling
9905 Bernried Niederbayern
9906 Mariaposching
9907 Zenting
9908 Schöfweg
991 Deggendorf
992
9920 Bischofsmais
9921 Regen
9922 Zwiesel
9923 Teisnach
9924 Bodenmais
9925 Bayerisch Eisenstein
9926 Frauenau
9927 Kirchberg im Wald
9928 Kirchdorf im Wald
9929 Ruhmannsfelden
993
9931 Plattling
9932 Osterhofen
9933 Wallersdorf
9935 Stephansposching
9936 Wallerfing
9937 Oberpöring
9938 Moos Niederbayern
994
9941 Bad Kötzting
9942 Viechtach
9943 Lam Oberpf.
9944 Miltach
9945 Arnbruck
9946 Hohenwarth bei Kötzting
9947 Neukirchen beim Heiligen Blut
9948 Eschlkam
995
9951 Landau an der Isar
9952 Eichendorf
9953 Pilsting
9954 Simbach Niederbayern
9955 Mamming
996
9961 Mitterfels
9962 Schwarzach (Niederbayern).
9963 Konzell
9964 Stallwang
9965 Sankt Englmar
9966 Wiesenfelden
997
9971 Cham
9972 Waldmünchen
9973 Furth im Wald
9974 Traitsching
9975 Waldmünchen-Geigant
9976 Rötz
9977 Arnschwang
9978 Schönthal (Oberpfalz)

See also
Telephone numbers in Germany

References
ITU allocations list

External links
Map with Area code zones (PDF; 800 KB)

Germany